= Livingston family =

Family that migrated from Scotland to the Province of New York in the 17th century

Livingston
- Current region: East Coast of the United States
- Origin: Scottish American Community, Dutch American Community — United Kingdom (Scotland), Netherlands, United States (New York)
- Connected families: Roosevelt family Hamilton family Astor family Bayard family Bush family Schuyler family Stevens family Stuyvesant family Van Cortlandt family Van Rensselaer family
- Estates: Livingston Manor; Clermont Manor; The Hermitage; Teviotdale

The Livingston family of New York is a prominent family that migrated from Scotland to the Dutch Republic, and then to the Province of New York in the 17th century. Descended from the 4th Lord Livingston, its members included signers of the United States Declaration of Independence (Philip Livingston) and the United States Constitution (William Livingston). Several members were Lords of Livingston Manor and Clermont Manor, located along the Hudson River in 18th-century eastern New York.

== Overview ==
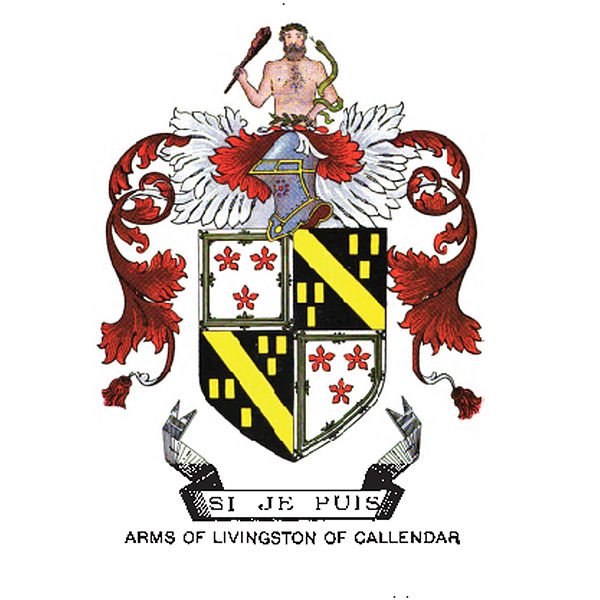
Arms of Livingston of Callendar

Descendants of the Livingstons include presidents of the United States George H. W. Bush and George W. Bush, First Lady of the United States Eleanor Roosevelt, suffragist Elizabeth Cady Stanton, Congressman Bob Livingston of Louisiana, much of the wealthy Astor family, New York governor Hamilton Fish, and actress Jane Wyatt. The eccentric Collyer brothers are alleged to have been descended from the Livingston family.

The Livingston family's burial crypt was established in 1727 at Livingston Memorial Church and Burial Ground in New York. Liberty Hall (also known as the William Livingston House) is the home built by New Jersey governor William Livingston, a signatory of the Constitution. Located in Elizabethtown, New Jersey, it has been designated as a National Historic Landmark, and it is operated as a museum within the Liberty Hall Campus of Kean University.

== Prominent members ==
John Livingstone (1603–1672)	Janet Fleming (1613–1693)
James Livingston (1646–1673)	Robert Livingston the Elder (1654–1728)	Alida Schuyler (1656–1727), sister of Pieter Schuyler, himself the brother-in-law of Stephanus Van Cortlandt and great-grandfather of Colonel James Livingston (1747-1832) and a great-uncle of Philip Schuyler.
Robert Livingston the Younger (1663–1725) m. Margarita Schuyler, daughter of Pieter Schuyler mayor of Albany New York and acting Governor of New York State	Philip Livingston (1686–1749)	Catharine Van Brugh, daughter of Mayor of Albany Pieter Van Brugh; greatuncle of Peter Gansevoort and related to Goose Van Schaick (Goose son of Mayor of Albany Sybrant Van Schaick);	Robert Livingston (1688–1775)	Gilbert Livingston (1690–1746), great grandfather of Hamilton Fish a descendant of Peter Stuyvesant; Fish's wife Julia Kean was a descendant of Philip Livingston
John Livingston (1709-1791) m. Catharina Ten Broeck (1715-1802), sister of Abraham Ten Broeck. An Older Brother of John Livingston was James Livingston (1701-1763) the father of Janet Livingston (1730-1819) the wife of Loyalist/Canadian Chief Justice William Smith (judge, born 1728) (1728-1793). An older sister of John Livingston was Engeltje Livingston (1698-1746) m. Johannes Van Rensselaer (1707-1783), parents of Katherine Van Rensselaer (1734-1803) (wife of General Philip Schuyler) and General Robert Van Rensselaer (1740-1802)	Peter Van Brugh Livingston (1710–1792), 5th great grandfather of Montgomery Clift	William Livingston (1723–90) Governor of New Jersey married Susannah French (1723–1789) in New Jersey in 1745. She was the daughter of landowner, Philip French III and Susanna (née Brockholst) French.[4] Her paternal grandparents were Phillip French, the 27th Mayor of New York City, and Annetje (née Philipse) French (the daughter of Frederick Philipse lord of Philipsburg Manor (sometimes referred to as Philipse Manor). Her maternal grandparents were Susanna Maria Brockholst and Anthony Brockholst, an acting Governor of Colonial New York under Sir Edmund Andros	Robert Livingston (1718–1775) His grandson-in-law was George Croghan (soldier) a nephew of William Clark and George Rogers Clark.	Henry Livingston, Sr. (1714–99). His granddaughter Susanna Livingston was the wife of Secretary of the Navy/Supreme Court Justice Smith Thompson and a cousin of Supreme Court Justice Henry Brockholst Livingston	Joanna Livingston (1722–1808) m. Pierre Van Cortlandt parents of Philip Van Cortlandt and Pierre Van Cortlandt Jr. Pierre Jr was the son-in-law of George Clinton (vice president) and brother-in-law to James Clinton	James Livingston (1728–90), 3rd great grandfather of Flora Sheldon Bush from whom are descended US Presidents Bush
Robert Livingston (1708–1790). Father-in-law of James Duane Mayor of New York. A great grandson Ancram Livingston (b.January 30, 1828-d.November 30, 1895) was the grandson of Vermont Governor Cornelius P. Van Ness.	Philip Livingston (1716–78) m. Christina Ten Broeck (1718-1801), sister of Abraham Ten Broeck(1734-1810) Abraham was the husband of Elizabeth Van Rensselaer, a sister of patroon Stephen Van Rensselaer II and great-granddaughter of the first native-born mayor of New York City, Stephanus Van Cortlandt. Van Cortlandt was also related to Philipse; Delancy; Izard; Skinner families and to British Generals Sir William Johnson, 1st Baronet and Thomas Gage.	Sarah Livingston (1725–1805) m. William Alexander (American general)-parents in law of Congressman William Duer (Continental Congressman) the grandfather of Congressman William Duer (U.S. congressman) Sarah Livingston was also the great-grandmother of US General Stephen W. Kearny
James Livingston (1747–1832) Grandfather of Gerrit Smith and Elizabeth Cady Stanton	Philip Peter Livingston (1740–1810)	Susannah Livingston (1748–?) m. John Cleves Symmes (Susanna was Stepmother-in-law of President William Henry Harrison)	Sarah Livingston (1756–1802) m. John Jay	Janet Livingston (1743–1828) m. Richard Montgomery	Gertrude Livingston (1757–1833) m. New York Governor Morgan Lewis son of Congressman Francis Lewis	Edward Livingston (1764–1836), author of the Livingston Code, U.S. Minister to France, U.S Secretary of State, U.S. Senator
Maria Livingston (aft.1830–?) m. James Duane Mayor of New York	Catharina Livingston (1745–1810) m. Stephen Van Rensselaer II great-grandson of Mayor of New York Stephanus Van Cortlandt	Henry Brockholst Livingston (1757–1823)	Robert R. Livingston (1746–1813) U.S. Minister to France; negotiator of the Louisiana Purchase	Alida Livingston (ca.1760–1822) m. John Armstrong Jr., parents-in-law of William Backhouse Astor, Sr.
Walter Livingston (1740–97) married Cornelia Schuyler a first cousin several times removed to Philip Schuyler	Philip P. Livingston (1741–87) Note: his daughter Christina Livingston's husband's brother was US Army general Alexander Macomb who was related by marriage to the Washington, Lee family of Virginia and George Mason families	Sarah Livingston (1752–1814)	John Henry Livingston (1746–1825)	Henry Livingston Jr. (1748–1828) Grandfather of Senator Sidney Breese and Admiral Samuel Livingston Breese
Charles L. Livingston (1800–73)	Stephen Van Rensselaer III (1764–1839) husband of Margarita daughter of Philip Schuyler and Katherine Van Rensselaer (a granddaughter of Robert Livingston the Younger). Stephen Rensselaer III was brother-in-law to Alexander Hamilton and Philip Jeremiah Schuyler (1768-1835). Stephen father-in-law from his 2nd marriage was the Governor of New Jersey William Paterson (judge). A younger brother of Stephen was Philip Schuyler Van Rensselaer (1767-1824) Mayor of Albany, New York. A son of Philip Jeremiah Schuyler was Robert Livingston Schuyler (1798-1855) Harvard Graduate of 1817 and railroad speculator/embezzler
Henry W. Livingston (1768–1810) great-great-great-grandfather of Congressman Bob Livingston	Philip Henry Livingston (1769–1831)	Edward Philip Livingston (1779–1843)	Elizabeth Stevens Livingston (1780–1829)
Edward Livingston (1796–1840) married to Sarah Lansing daughter of Chancellor of New York John Lansing Jr. Two of Sarah cousins-descended from New Jersey Governor Lewis Morris (governor)-Richard Ray and Barnett Bleecker Lansing also married into Livingston Family	Elisabeth (Livingston) Ludlow (1813–96), grandmother of Anna Hall Roosevelt and great-grandmother of Eleanor Roosevelt

== Family tree ==
Livingston family members
- John Livingston (1603–1672) ∞ Janet Fleming (1613–1693)
  - James Livingston (1646–1673)
    - Robert Livingston the Younger (1663–1725) ∞ Margarita Schuyler (b. 1682)
      - Engeltje "Angelica" Livingston (1698–1746/7) ∞ Johannes Van Rensselaer (1708–1783)
        - Catherine Van Rensselaer (1734–1803) ∞ Philip Schuyler (1733–1804)
        - Jeremiah Van Rensselaer (1738–1810) ∞ (1) 1760: Judith Bayard (d. 1764) ∞ (2) 1764: Helena "Lena" Lansing (1743–1795)
        - Robert Van Rensselaer (1740–1802) ∞ Cornelia Rutsen (1747–1790)
      - James Livingston (1701–1763) ∞ Maria Kierstede (1704–1762)
        - Robert James Livingston (1725–1771) ∞ Susanna Smith (1729–1791)
          - William Smith Livingston (1755–1795)
          - Peter Robert Livingston (1766–1847) ∞ Joanna Livingston (1759–1827)
          - Maturin Livingston (1769–1847) ∞ Margaret Lewis (1780–1860) (daughter of Morgan Lewis)
            - Morgan Lewis Livingston (1799–1869) ∞ Catharine Currie Manning (1809–1886)
            - Julia Livingston (1801–1882) ∞ Joseph Delafield (1790–1875)
              - Julia Livingston Delafield (1837–1914)
            - Robert James Livingston (1811–1891) ∞ Louisa Matilda Storm (1807–1883)
              - Louise Matilda Livingston (1836–1920) ∞ Elbridge Thomas Gerry (1837–1927)
                - Robert Livingston Gerry, Sr. (1877–1957) ∞ Cornelia Averell Harriman (1884-1966)
                - Peter Goelet Gerry (1879–1957) ∞ (1) 1910 (div. 1925): Mathilde Scott Townsend (1885–1949) ∞ (2) 1925: Edith Stuyvesant (née Dresser) Vanderbilt (1873–1958)
            - Maturin Livingston Jr. (1815–1888) ∞ Ruth Baylies (1827–1918)
              - Elizabeth Livingston (1855–1943) ∞ William George Cavendish-Bentinck (1854–1909) (son of George Augustus Frederick Cavendish-Bentinck)
                - Mary Augusta Cavendish-Bentinck (1881–1913) ∞ 1906: John Gorman Ford (d. 1906)
                - Ruth Evelyn Cavendish-Bentinck (1883–1978) ∞ 1907: Walter Spencer Morgan Burns (1872–1929) (nephew of J. P. Morgan)
              - Ruth T. Livingston (1855–1920) ∞ Ogden Mills (1856–1929)
                - Gladys Livingston Mills (1883–1970) ∞ 1907: Henry Carnegie Phipps (1879–1953) (son of Henry Phipps Jr.)
                  - Ogden Phipps (1908–2002) ∞ (1) Ruth Pruyn (1907–1994); ∞ (2) Lillian Stokes Bostwick (1906–1987)
                    - Ogden Mills Phipps (1940-2016)
                  - Barbara Phipps (1911–1987) ∞ Stuart Symington Janney Jr. (1907–1988)
                    - Stuart S. Janney III
                  - Audrey Phipps (d. 1992) ∞ Philip Dana Holden (d. 1973)
                  - Sonia Phipps (1919–2006) ∞ Hans Christoph Farrell, Count of Seherr-Thoss (1912–1992)
                - Jane Beatrice Mills (1883–1972) ∞ 1909: Bernard Forbes, 8th Earl of Granard (1874–1948)
                  - Lady Moira Forbes (1910-1994) ∞ Count Rossi of Switzerland
                  - Arthur Forbes, 9th Earl of Granard (1915-1992) ∞ Marie-Madeleine Eugenie, Princess of Faucigny Lucinge (d. 1990)
                  - Lady Eileen Beatrice Forbes (1919-1993) ∞ John Crichton-Stuart, 5th Marquess of Bute (1907–1956)
                  - Hon. John Forbes (1920-1982)
                - Ogden Livingston Mills (1884–1937) ∞ (1) 1911 (div 1919): Margaret Stuyvesant Rutherford (daughter of Anne Harriman Vanderbilt); (2) 1924: Dorothy Randolph Fell
            - Henry Beekman Livingston (1818–1862) ∞ Mary Lawrence Livingston (1821–1883)
            - Angelica Livingston (1820–1896) ∞ Alexander Hamilton Jr. (1816–1889)
            - Blanche Geraldine Livingston (1822–1897) ∞ Lydig Monson Hoyt (1821–1868)
        - Janet Livingston (1730–1819) ∞ William Smith (1728–1793)
        - Margaret Livingston (1738–1809) ∞ Peter Robert Livingston (1737–1793)
      - Janet Livingston (b. 1703) ∞ Colonel Henry Beekman
        - Margaret Beekman (1724–1800) ∞ Robert Livingston (1718–1775)
      - John Livingston (1709–1791) ∞ Catharina Ten Broeck (1715–1802)
        - James Livingston (1747–1832) ∞ 1772: Elizabeth Simpson (1750–1800)
          - Elizabeth Livingston (1773–1818) ∞ Peter Gerrit Smith (1768–1837)
            - Gerrit Smith (1797–1874) ∞ (1) 1819: Wealtha Ann Backus (1800–1819) ∞ (2) 1822: Ann Carroll Fitzhugh (1805–1879)
              - Elizabeth Smith (1822–1911) ∞ Charles Dudley Miller (1818–1896)
              - Greene Smith (1841–1880) ∞ Elizabeth "Bessie" Fitzhugh (1841–1918)
          - Edward Livingston (1783–1843) ∞ Martha Nelson (1785–1855)
          - Margaret Livingston (1784–1871) ∞ Daniel Cady (1773–1859)
            - Elizabeth Cady (1815–1902) ∞ Henry Brewster Stanton (1805–1887)
          - Richard Montgomery Livingston (1787–1838) ∞ Sarah Jacobs (1792–1873)
          - Catharine Ten Broeck Livingston (1789–1874) ∞ Henry Brevoort Henry (1786–1818)
  - Robert Livingston the Elder, 1st Lord of the manor (1654–1728) ∞ Alida (née Schuyler) Van Rensselaer (1656–1727)
    - Johannes Livingston (1680–1720) ∞ 1701: Mary Winthrop (1683–1713) (daughter of Fitz-John Winthrop); ∞ 1713: Elizabeth Knight (1689–1736) (daughter of Sarah Kemble Knight)
    - Margaret Livingston (1681–1758) ∞ Samuel Vetch (1668–1732)
    - Philip Livingston, 2nd Lord of the manor (1686–1749) ∞ Catherine Van Brugh (b. 1689)
      - Robert Livingston, 3rd Lord of the manor (1708–1790) ∞ (1) Maria Thong (1711–1765) (granddaughter of Rip Van Dam); ∞ (2) Gertrude (née Van Rensselaer) Schuyler (b. 1714) (daughter of Kiliaen Van Rensselaer)
        - Peter Robert Livingston (1737–1793) ∞ Margaret Livingston (1738–1809) (granddaughter of Robert Livingston the Younger)
        - Maria "Mary" Livingston (1738–1821) ∞ James Duane (1733–1797)
          - Mary Duane (b. 1762) ∞ 1787: William North (1755–1836)
          - Adelia Duane (1765–1860) ∞ Alfred Sands Pell (1786–1831)
            - Robert Livingston Pell (1811–1880) ∞ Maria Louisa Brinckerhoff (1816–1866)
            - James Duane Pell (1813–1881) ∞ Sophia Gertrude Pell (1815-1885)
            - George Washington Pell (1820–1896) ∞ Mary Bruen (d. 1890)
            - Richard Montgomery Pell (1822–1882) ∞ Frances Mary Jones Hoyt (1839–1930)
          - James Chatham Duane (1769–1842) ∞ Mary Ann Bowers (1773–1828)
            - James Chatham Duane Jr. (b. 1794) ∞ Harriet Constable (1794–1860)
              - James Chatham Duane III (1824–1897) ∞ Harriet Whitehorne Brewerton
          - Sarah Duane (1775-1828) ∞ 1808: George William Featherstonhaugh (1780–1866)
            - George William Featherstonhaugh Jr. (1814–1900)
        - Walter Livingston (1740–1797) ∞ Cornelia Schuyler (1746–1822) (granddaughter of Pieter Schuyler)
          - Henry Walter Livingston (1768–1810) ∞ 1796: Mary Masters Allen (1776–1855) (granddaughter of William Allen)
            - Henry Walter Livingston (1798–1848) ∞ 1823: Caroline de Grasse de Pau (1806–1871)
            - Walter Livingston (1799–1872) ∞ 1828: Mary Livingston Greenleaf (1802–1886) (daughter of James Greenleaf)
            - Mary Livingston (1803–1880) ∞ 1825: James Thomson Jr. (d. 1847)
            - Elizabeth Livingston (1807–1860) ∞ 1828: William Denning Henderson (1803–1852)
            - Cornelia Livingston (1808–1884) ∞ 1828: Carroll Livingston (1805–1867) (son of Henry Brockholst Livingston)
            - Anne Greenleaf Livingston (1809–1887) ∞ 1829: Anson Livingston (1807–1873) (son of Henry Brockholst Livingston)
          - Maria Livingston (1770–1828) ∞ Philip Henry Livingston (1770–1831)
          - Peter Schuyler Livingston (1772–1809) ∞ Eliza Barclay (1776–1817) (daughter of Thomas Henry Barclay)
          - Robert L. Livingston (1775–1843) ∞ Margaret Maria Livingston (1783–1818) (daughter of Chancellor Livingston)
          - Gertrude Livingston (1778–1864) ∞ William Cutting (1773–1820)
            - Francis Brockholst Cutting (1804–1870) ∞ Anne Markoe Heyward (1807–1885)
              - William Cutting (1832–1897)
              - Francis Brockholst Cutting (1834–1869) ∞ Marion Ramsay (1834–1912)
                - Francis Brockholst Cutting (1861–1896)
            - Fulton Cutting (1816–1875) ∞ Elise Justine Bayard (1823–1852) (granddaughter of William Bayard Jr.)
              - William Bayard Cutting (1850–1912) ∞ Olivia Peyton Murray (1855–1949)
                - William Bayard Cutting Jr. (1878–1910) ∞ 1901: Lady Sybil Marjorie Cuffe (daughter of Hamilton Cuffe, 5th Earl of Desart
                - Justine Bayard Cutting (1879–1975) ∞ 1901 (div): George Cabot Ward (1876–1936)
                - Bronson Murray Cutting (1888–1935)
                - Olivia Murray Cutting (1892–1963) ∞ 1917: Henry James (son of William James)
          - Harriet Livingston (1783–1826) ∞ (1) 1806: Robert Fulton (1765–1815); ∞ (2) 1816: Charles Augustus Dale (1784-1832)
            - Cornelia Livingston Fulton (1812–1893) ∞ Edward Charles Crary (1806–1848)
            - Mary Livingston Fulton (1813–1861) ∞ Robert Morris Ludlow (1812–1894)
        - Robert "Cambridge" Livingston (1742–1794) ∞ Alice Swift (1751–1816), daughter of John Swift
        - Catherine Livingston (1744–1832) ∞ John Patterson (1740–1823) (brother of Walter Patterson)
          - Daniel Todd Patterson (1786–1839) ∞ George Ann Pollock (1787–1851)
            - Elizabeth Catherine Patterson (1815–1884) ∞ George Mifflin Bache (1811–1846) (brother of Alexander Dallas Bache)
            - Carlile Pollock Patterson (1816–1881) ∞ Elizabeth Worthington Pearson (1826–1902) (daughter of Joseph Pearson)
            - Georgia Ann Patterson (1820–1893) ∞ 1839: David Dixon Porter (1813–1891)
            - Thomas Harmon Patterson (1820–1889) ∞ Maria Montresor Wainwright (d. 1881)
          - Walter Patterson (d. 1852)
        - Alida Livingston (1747–1791) ∞ Valentine Gardiner
        - John Livingston (1749–1822) ∞ (1) Maria Ann Leroy (1759–1797) (daughter of Jacob Leroy and Cornelia Rutgers); ∞ (2) Catherine (Livingston) Ridley (daughter of William Livingston)
        - Hendrick "Henry" Livingston (1752–1823)
      - Peter Van Brugh Livingston (1712–1792) ∞ (1) Mary Alexander (1721–1767) (daughter of James Alexander & Mary Spratt Provoost) ∞ (2) 1771: Elizabeth Ricketts
        - Philip Peter Livingston (1740–1810) ∞ Cornelia Van Horne (b. 1759) (daughter of David Van Horne)
          - Peter Van Brugh Livingston (1792–1868) ∞ Maria "Harriet" Elizabeth Houston
            - Elizabeth Ludlow Livingston (1836–1895) ∞ Joseph Montgomery Strong (1822–1894)
            - Van Brugh Livingston (1840–1904) ∞ Ada Mary Jaudon (b. 1839)
        - Catherine Livingston (1743–1775) ∞ Nicholas Bayard (1736–1798)
        - James Alexander Livingston (b. 1744)
        - Mary Livingston (b. 1746) ∞ John Brown
        - Peter Van Brugh Livingston Jr. (b. 1753) ∞ Susan Blondel
        - Sarah Livingston (1755–1825) ∞ James Ricketts
        - Susan Livingston (1759–1853) ∞ (1) 1789: John Kean (1756–1795); ∞ (2) 1800: Count Julian Niemcewicz (1758–1841) (aide to Kościuszko)
          - Peter Philip James Kean (1788–1828) ∞ Sarah Sabina Morris (1788–1878)
            - John Kean (1814–1895) ∞ Lucinetta "Lucy" Halsted (1825–1912) (daughter of Caleb O. Halsted)
              - John Kean (1852–1914)
              - Christine Griffin Kean (1858–1936) ∞ William Emlen Roosevelt (1857–1930) (son of James A. Roosevelt)
              - Hamilton Fish Kean (1862–1941) ∞ Katharine Taylor Winthrop (1866–1943)
                - Robert Winthrop Kean (1893–1980) ∞ Elizabeth Stuyvesant Howard (1898-1988)
                  - Thomas Howard Kean (b. 1935) ∞ Deborah Bye (1943–2020)
                    - Thomas Howard Kean Jr. (b. 1968) ∞ Rhonda Norton (b. 1968)
            - Julia Ursin Niemcewiez Kean (1816–1887) ∞ Hamilton Fish (1808–1893)
            - Christine Alexander William Kean (1826–1915) ∞ William Preston Griffin (1810–1851)
        - Elizabeth Livingston (1761–1787) ∞ 1787: Louis-Guillaume Otto (1754–1817)
      - John Livingston (1714–1786) ∞ Catharine de Peyster (1724–1804) (granddaughter of Abraham de Peyster)
      - Philip Livingston (1716–1778) ∞ Christina Ten Broeck (1718–1801) (daughter of Dirck Ten Broeck)
        - Philip Philip Livingston (1741–1787) ∞ Sara Johnson (1749–1802)
          - Philip Henry Livingston (1769–1831) ∞ Maria Livingston (1770–1828) (daughter of Walter Livingston)
            - Edward Livingston (1796–1840) ∞ Sarah Ray Lansing (1797–1848) (daughter of John Ten Eyck Lansing Jr.)
              - Edward Livingston (1834–1906) ∞ Fanny Hazeltine
                - Clarisse Hazeltine Livingston (1834–1906) ∞ Fanny Hazeltine
          - Edward Philip Livingston (1779–1843) ∞ (1) 1799: Elizabeth Stevens Livingston (1780–1829) (daughter of Chancellor Livingston); ∞ (2) 1832: Mary Crooke Broom (1804–1877) (later married Charles Herman Ruggles)
            - Margaret Livingston (1808–1874) ∞ David Augustus Clarkson (1793–1874)
              - Thomas Streatfeild Clarkson (1837–1894)
            - Elizabeth Livingston (1813–1896) ∞ Edward Hunter Ludlow (1810–1884)
              - Mary Livingston Ludlow (1843–1919) ∞ Valentine Gill Hall Jr. (1834–1880)
                - Anna Rebecca Hall (1863–1892) ∞ Elliott Roosevelt (1860–1894) (brother of Theodore Roosevelt)
                  - Eleanor Roosevelt (1884–1962) ∞ Franklin D. Roosevelt (1882–1945)
                    - James Roosevelt (1907–1991)
                    - Elliott Roosevelt (1910–1990)
                    - Franklin D. Roosevelt Jr. (1914–1988)
                  - Elliott Roosevelt Jr. (1889–1893)
                  - Gracie Hall Roosevelt (1891–1941) ∞ (1) Margaret Richardson (1892–1971); ∞ (2) Dorothy Kemp (1898–1985)
                - Valentine Hall III (1867–1934)
                - Edward Ludlow Hall (1872–1932)
            - Clermont Livingston (1817–1895) ∞ Cornelia Livingston (1824–1851)
              - Mary Livingston (d. 1876) ∞ 1874: Frederic de Peyster (1843–1874) (son of John Watts de Peyster)
              - John Henry Livingston (1848–1927) ∞ (1) Catherine Livingston Hamersley (d. 1873) (sister of J. Hooker Hamersley); ∞ (2) Emily Evans
            - Robert Edward Livingston (1820–1889) ∞ Susan Maria Clarkson de Peyster (1823–1910)
              - Catharine Goodhue Livingston (1856–1931)
              - Robert Robert Livingston (1858–1899) ∞ Mary Tailer (1863–1944)
              - Edward De Peyster Livingston (1861–1932)
              - Goodhue Livingston (1867–1951) ∞ married Louisa Robb (1877–1960) (daughter of J. Hampden Robb)
                - Goodhue Livingston Jr. (1897–1994) ∞ (1) 1919 (div 1931): Joan Livingston Allen (1898–1964) (daughter of Frederick Hobbes Allen); ∞ (2) 1932 (div 1950s) Lorna Mackay (1911–1986); (3) (div) Ruth Monsch Gordon; ∞ (4) 1966: Dorothy Michelson-Stevens-Bitter-Dick (d. 1994) (daughter of Albert A. Michelson)
                - Cornelia Thayer Livingston (1903–1975) ∞ 1927: Frederic Cromwell Jr. (1900–1973)
                  - Katherine Cromwell (b. 1928) ∞ David Elmslie Moore (1923-2012), (son of William Scoville Moore and Edith Pulitzer and grandson of Joseph Pulitzer)
                  - Florence Cromwell (b. 1931)
                  - Seymour Cromwell III (1934–1977)
                  - Cornelia Livingston Cromwell ∞ 1958: Richard Pillard (b. 1933)
          - Christina Livingston ∞ John Navarre Macomb (1774–1810) (son of Alexander Macomb)
        - Catherine Livingston (1745–1810) ∞ (1) 1764: Stephen Van Rensselaer II (1742–1769); ∞ (2) 1775: Eilardus Westerlo (1738–1790)
          - Stephen Van Rensselaer III (1764–1839) ∞ (1) 1783: Margarita Schuyler (1758–1801) ∞ (2) 1802: Cornelia Bell Paterson (1780–1844) (daughter of William Paterson)
            - Stephen Van Rensselaer IV (1789–1868) ∞ Harriet Elizabeth Bayard (1799–1875) (daughter of William Bayard Jr.)
          - Philip Schuyler Van Rensselaer (1767–1824) ∞ Anne De Peyster Van Cortlandt (1766–1855) (sister of Philip Van Cortlandt)
          - Rensselaer Westerlo (1776–1851) ∞ Jane Lansing (1785–1871) (daughter of John Ten Eyck Lansing Jr.)
          - Catharine Westerlo (1778–1846) ∞ John Woodworth (1768–1858)
        - Margaret Livingston (1747–1830) ∞ Dr. Thomas Jones (1733–1794)
        - Sarah Livingston (1752–1814) ∞ John Henry Livingston (1746–1825)
      - Hendrick "Henry" Livingston (1719–1772)
      - William Livingston (1723–1790) ∞ 1745 Susannah French (1723–1789) (granddaughter of Phillip French)
        - Susannah Livingston (1748–1840) ∞ 1780: John Cleves Symmes (1742–1814) (father-in-law of William Henry Harrison)
        - Catherine Livingston (1751–1813) ∞ (1) Matthew Ridley (1746–1789); ∞ (2) John Livingston (1750–1822) (son of Robert Livingston)
        - Mary Livingston (b. 1753) ∞ 1771: James Linn
        - William Livingston Jr. (1754–1817) ∞ Mary Lennington
        - Sarah Van Brugh Livingston (1756–1802) ∞ John Jay (1745–1829)
        - Henry Brockholst Livingston (1757–1823) ∞ (1) 1784: Catherine Keteltas (1761–1804); ∞ (2) 1804: Ann N. Ludlow (1775–1815); ∞ (3) 1815: Catherine Seaman (1775–1859)
          - Eliza Livingston (1786–1860) ∞ Jasper Hall Livingston (1780–1835) (son of Philip Philip Livingston)
          - Susan French Livingston (1789–1864) ∞ Benjamin Ledyard (1779–1812)
          - Catherine Augusta Livingston (b. c. 1790) ∞ Archibald McVicker (1785–1849)
          - Carroll Livingston (1805–1867) ∞ Cornelia Livingston.
          - Anson Livingston (1807–1873) ∞ Anne Greenleaf Livingston (1809–1887) (daughter of Henry Walter Livingston)
          - Jasper Hall Livingston (1815–1900) ∞ 1851: Matilda Anne Cecila Morris (daughter of Sir John Morris, 2nd Baronet of Clasemont)
          - Catherine Louise Livingston (b. 1815) ∞ Maurice Power (1811–1870)
          - Henry Brockholst Livingston (1819–1892) ∞ Marianna Gribaldo
        - Judith Livingston (1758-1843) ∞ John W. Watkins
      - Sarah Livingston (1725–1805) ∞ 1748: William Alexander, Lord Stirling (1726–1783)
      - Alida Livingston (1728–1790) ∞ (1) Henry Hansen (d. 1758); ∞ (2) Martinus Hoffman (1706–1772) (father-in-law of Isaac Roosevelt)
      - Catherine Livingston (1733–1807) ∞ 1759: John Lawrence (1721–1764)
    - Robert Livingston (1688–1775) ∞ Margaret Howarden (1693–1758)
      - Robert R. Livingston (1718–1775) ∞ Margaret Beekman
        - Chancellor Robert R. Livingston (1746–1813) ∞ 1770: Mary Stevens (1751–1814) (daughter of John Stevens)
          - Elizabeth Stevens Livingston (1780–1829) ∞ Edward Philip Livingston (1779–1843)
          - Margaret Maria Livingston (1783–1818) ∞ Robert L. Livingston (1775–1843) (son of Walter Livingston)
        - Janet Livingston (d. 1824) ∞ 1773: Richard Montgomery (1738–1775)
        - Margaret Livingston (1749–1823) ∞ Thomas Tillotson (1750–1832)
        - Henry Beekman Livingston (1750–1831) ∞ 1781: Ann Hume Shippen (1763–1841) (daughter of Dr. William Shippen)
        - Catharine Livingston (1752–1849) ∞ 1791: Freeborn Garrettson (1752–1827)
        - John R. Livingston (1755–1851) ∞ (1) 1779: Margaret Sheafe; ∞ (2) 1789: Eliza McEvers (d. 1810)
          - Robert Montgomery Livingston (1790–1838) ∞ 1811: Sarah Barclay Bache
          - Serena Eliza Livingston (1795–1884) ∞ George Croghan (1791–1849) (nephew of William Clark)
          - John Robert Livingston (1803–1871) ∞ Mary McEvers (1806–1843)
            - Edward Louis Livingston (1829–1888) ∞ Mary Josephine Kernochan (1828–1908) (sister of James P. Kernochan and J. Frederic Kernochan)
              - Mary Josephine Livingston (1854–1937) ∞ (1) 1872: Campbell Boyd (1842–1894); ∞ (2) 1895: Charles Joseph Blanc, Vicomte de Lanautte d'Hauterive (b. 1848); ∞ (3) 1913: Charles Gaston, Comte de Fontenilliat
              - Edward McEvers Livingston (1856–1938) ∞ Sarah McAlpine Pollack
              - Helen Margaretta Livingston (1860–1929) ∞ 1896: Granville Frederick Richard Farquhar
        - Gertrude Livingston (1757–1833) ∞ Morgan Lewis (1754–1844) (son of Francis Lewis)
          - Margret Lewis (1780–1860) ∞ Maturin Livingston (1769–1847)
        - Joanna Livingston (1759–1827) ∞ Peter R. Livingston (1766–1847)
        - Alida Livingston (1761–1822) ∞ John Armstrong Jr. (1758–1843) (son of Gen. John Armstrong, Sr.)
        - Edward Livingston (1764–1836) ∞ 1778: Mary McEvers; ∞ (2) 1805: Madame Louise Moreau de Lassy (sister of Auguste Davezac)
    - Hubertus "Gilbert" Livingston (1690–1746) ∞ Cornelia Beekman (1693–1742) (daughter of Hendrick Beekman and granddaughter of Wilhelmus Beekman)
      - Robert Gilbert Livingston (1712–1789) ∞ Catherine McPheadres (1717–1792)
        - Robert Gilbert Livingston (1749–1791) ∞ Margaret Hude (1751–1824)
        - Helen Livingston (1751–1791) ∞ Samuel Hake
          - Helen Hake (1773–1801) ∞ Frederic De Peyster (1758–1834) (nephew of Arent DePeyster)
            - Frederic De Peyster (1796–1882) ∞ (1) 1820: Mary Justina Watts ∞ (2) 1839: Maria Antoinette Kane Hone (1798–1869)
              - John Watts de Peyster (1821–1907) ∞ 1841: Estelle Livingston (1819–1898)
        - Catherine Livingston (1756–1829) ∞ John Reade (1745–1808)
          - Catherine Livingston Reade (1777–1863) ∞ Nicholas William Stuyvesant (1769–1833)
          - Ann Reade (b. 1783) ∞ Robert Kearney (1783–1832)
            - Susan Watts Kearney (1819–1893) ∞ William Ingram Street (son of Randall S. Street)
              - Anna Livingston Reade Street (1846–1918) ∞ Levi Parsons Morton (1824–1920)
          - Helen Sarah Reade (1787–1879) ∞ James Hooker (1792–1858)
        - Gilbert Robert Livingston (1758–1816) ∞ Martha De Lancey Kane (1758–1843)
        - Henry Gilbert Livingston (1758–1817) ∞ Ann Nutter
        - Simon Johnson Livingston (b. 1762)
      - Henry Gilbert Livingston (1714–1799) ∞ Susannah Storm Conklin (1724–1793)
        - Gilbert Livingston (1742–1806) ∞ 1763: Catherine Crannell (1745–1830)
          - Sarah Livingston (1777–1833) ∞ Smith Thompson (1768–1843)
        - John Henry Livingston (1746—1825) ∞ 1775: Sarah Livingston (1752–1814)
          - Henry Alexander Livingston (1776–1849)
        - Henry Livingston Jr. (1748–1828) ∞ (1) Sarah Welles ∞ (2): Jane McLean Patterson (1769–1838)
        - Cornelia Livingston (1750–1810) ∞ Myndert Van Kleeck (1744–1799)
        - Catherine Elizabeth Livingston (1751–1828) ∞ (1) Thomas Mifflin (1744–1800) ∞ (2) Peter Close, Sr. (b. 1751)
        - Joanna Livingston (1754–1795) ∞ Paul Schenck (1741–1817)
        - Susan Livingston (1755–1781) ∞ Gerardus Duyckinck (1754–1814)
        - Alida Livingston Woolsey (1758–1843) ∞ 1779: Melancthon Lloyd Woolsey (1754–1819)
          - Melancthon Taylor Woolsey (1782–1838)
        - Robert Henry Livingston (1760–1804) ∞ Catherine "Cady" Tappan (1772–1841)
        - Beekman Livingston (b. 1762) ∞ Catherine Marsh (1772–1854)
        - Helena Livingston (1767–1859) ∞ Jonas Platt (1769–1834)
          - Zephaniah Platt (1796–1871)
      - Alida Livingston (1716–1798) ∞ (1) 1737: Jacob Rutsen (1716–1753); ∞ (2) 1762: Hendrick van Rensselaer (1712–1793)
        - Johannes Rutsen (1743–1771) ∞ (1) 1767: Phebe Carmen (1747–1819) (Phebe married Robert Sands (1745–1835) after Johannes death)
        - Cornelia Rutsen (1746–1790) ∞ Robert Van Rensselaer (1740–1802)
      - Joanna Livingston (1722–1808) ∞ Pierre Van Cortlandt (1721–1814)
      - James Livingston (1728–1790) ∞ Judith Newcomb (1733–1808)
        - Cornelia Livingston (1751–1820) ∞ (1) Lawrence Van Kleeck (1749–1783); ∞ (2) Andrew Billings (1743–1808)
        - Judith Newcomb Livingston (b. 1753) ∞ John Moore, Esq. (1745–1828)
        - Gilbert James Livingston (1758–1833) ∞ Susannah Lewis (1761–1822)
          - Judith Lewis Livingston (1785–1858) ∞ Samuel Butler (1785–1851)
            - Courtland Philip Livingston Butler (1813–1891) ∞ Elizabeth Slade Pierce (1822–1901)
              - Mary Elizabeth Butler (1850–1897) ∞ Robert Emmet Sheldon (1845–1917)
                - Flora Sheldon (1872–1920) ∞ Samuel Prescott Bush (1863–1948) (son of James Smith Bush)
                  - Prescott Sheldon Bush (1895–1972) ∞ Dorothy Walker (1901–1992) (daughter of George Herbert Walker)
                    - Prescott Sheldon Bush Jr. (1922–2010)
                    - George Herbert Walker Bush (1924–2018) ∞ Barbara Pierce (1925–2018)
                      - George Walker Bush (b. 1946) ∞ Laura Welch (b. 1946)
                      - John Ellis Bush (b. 1953) ∞ Columba Gallo (b. 1953)
                        - George Prescott Bush (b. 1976) ∞ Amanda Williams
                    - Nancy Walker Bush (1926–2021) ∞ 1946 (div. 1989) Alexander Ellis II (1922–1989)
                    - Jonathan James Bush (1931–2021) ∞ Josephine Bradley
                    - William Henry Trotter Bush (1938—2018)
              - Theodore Earl Butler (1861–1936) ∞ 1892: Suzanne Hoschedé (c. 1864–1899) (daughter of Alice Hoschedé and Ernest Hoschedé, and stepdaughter of Claude Monet)
      - Margaret Livingston (1738–1818) ∞ Peter Stuyvesant (1727–1805), (great-grandson of Peter Stuyvesant)
        - Nicholas William Stuyvesant (1769–1833) ∞ Catherine Livingston Reade (1777–1863)
    - Joanna Livingston (1694–1734) ∞ Cornelius Gerrit Van Horne (1694–1752)
      - Gerrit Van Horne (1726–1765) ∞ 1751: Anne Reade (1726–1772) (daughter of Joseph Reade)
