= William Cutting =

- Born: 1832; New York City, New York, U.S.
- Died: March 26, 1897 (aged 64–65); New York City, New York, U.S.
- Education: Columbia University; Harvard Law School
- Parent(s): Francis B. Cutting; Anne Markoe Heyward Cutting
- Relatives: William Bayard Cutting (cousin); Robert Fulton Cutting (cousin)

William Cutting (1832 – March 26, 1897) was an American lawyer and soldier who "was one of the best known society leaders and a recognized authority on all matters of etiquette and affairs of honor."

== Early life ==
Willy Cutting was born in 1832 in New York City. He was the eldest son of New York State Assemblyman and U.S. Representative Francis Brockholst Cutting (1804–1870) and Anne Markoe (née Heyward) Cutting (1807–1885) of South Carolina. Among his siblings was Francis Brockholst Cutting (who married Marion Ramsay and was the father of F. Brockholst Cutting) and Heyward Cutting.

Cutting was the grandson of William Cutting and Gertrude (née Livingston) Cutting. Through his paternal grandmother, he was a direct descendant of Walter Livingston (the first Speaker of the New York State Assembly) and Robert Livingston (the third and last Lord of Livingston Manor). His maternal grandparents were William Heyward and Sarah (née Cruger) Heyward. Through his uncle Fulton Cutting and aunt Elise Bayard Cutting, he was a first cousin of attorney and merchant William Bayard Cutting and financier Robert Fulton Cutting.

He studied at Columbia University in New York City followed by Harvard Law School in Cambridge, Massachusetts. He is shown on official documents as matriculating with the class of 1851 of Columbia College, but it is unsure whether he finished his degree.

== Career ==
After graduation, he practiced law for a short time in New York City with his father.

When the U.S. Civil War started, he volunteered his service for the Union Army and was commissioned as a Captain of Volunteers and Assistant Quartermaster. He was later tapped to serve on the staff of Major General Ambrose E. Burnside as Assistant Commissary of Subsistence before promotion to Major on July 22, 1862, and mustered in as aide-de-Camp to General Burnside. For the remainder of the war, he served with General Burnside's command, the IX Corps. During the War, he was charged with carrying a challenge for a duel from Capt. Charles Gordon Hutton to Capt. J. M. Cutts. On March 13, 1865, he was brevetted Brigadier General of U.S. Volunteers for "gallant and meritorious services at the Battle of Fredericksburg, Va."

In 1870, Cutting was among the founders of the Knickerbocker Club, including August Belmont, John Jacob Astor III, Philip Schuyler and William Watts Sherman.

== Personal life ==
Cutting died on March 26, 1897, at the home of his cousin, Walter L. Cutting at 30 West 20th Street in New York City. After a funeral at Grace Church in Manhattan conducted by the Rev. Dr. William Reed Huntington (the pallbearers were J. Bower Lee, Alfred Grimes, Peter Marie, Clement C. Hand, Oliver A. C. Morrison, and J. W. Clendenning), he was buried at Green-Wood Cemetery in Brooklyn.

=== Cutting estate ===
Upon his father's death in 1870, his estate was worth over $4,000,000, with personal property totaling $1,230,767.96, and around $1,300,000 in bonds for Wabash Railroad, and was the owner of the Indianapolis, Peru and Chicago Railroad. According to his father's will, the estate was split up between William, his brother Hayward and his late brother Francis' widow, Marion Ramsay Cutting. After allegations of misdeeds by Marion, the estate was finally settled, and William was excused as executor in 1888.

== See also ==
- List of American Civil War brevet generals (Union)
