= William Bayard Cutting Jr. =

American diplomat

W. Bayard Cutting Jr.
- Born: William Bayard Cutting Jr. June 13, 1878; New York City, U.S.
- Died: March 10, 1910 (aged 31); Aswan, Egypt
- Education: Harvard University; Columbia Law School
- Occupation: Diplomat
- Spouse: Lady Sybil Marjorie Cuffe (m. 1901)
- Children: Iris Origo
- Parent(s): William Bayard Cutting; Olivia Peyton Murray Cutting
- Relatives: Justine Ward (sister); Bronson M. Cutting (brother); Robert Fulton Cutting (uncle); Elise J. Bayard (grandmother)

William Bayard Cutting Jr. (June 13, 1878 – March 19, 1910) was an American diplomat who served as secretary to the U.S. embassy to the Court of St. James's.

== Early life ==
Cutting was born in New York City on June 13, 1878, (Note: Some sources indicate Cutting was born in Morristown, New Jersey, others indicate he was born in New York City.) and grew up at Westbrook, the family estate in Long Island. He was the eldest of four children born to William Bayard Cutting and Olivia Peyton (née Murray) Cutting (1855–1949). His younger siblings included Justine Bayard Cutting, Bronson Murray Cutting, a U.S. Senator, and Olivia Murray Cutting, who married Henry James.

His maternal grandfather was Bronson Murray of Murray Hill. Through his paternal grandparents, Fulton Cutting and Elise Justine Bayard, he was a descendant of the Livingston family His great-grandfather, Robert Bayard, was Robert Fulton's partner, and both married Livingston sisters. Cutting ancestors included members from the Bayard, Schuyler and Van Cortlandt families of colonial New York. His uncle was financier Robert Fulton Cutting.

Cutting prepared at the Groton School, before entering Harvard University in the Autumn of 1896, where he graduated in 1900, completing his courses in only "three years with the highest honors." While at Harvard, he was a member of Phi Beta Kappa, played on his class' baseball team, was captain of the University golf team, and became friends with George Santayana.

== Career ==
After his graduation from Harvard, Cutting went abroad as private secretary to Joseph Hodges Choate, the U.S. Ambassador to the United Kingdom, where he met his wife.

After his marriage, Cutting returned to the United States where he studied law at Columbia Law School, but never engaged in active practice. While in New York, they stayed at the residence of his father, 24 East 72nd Street, and he was an active member of the Knickerbocker Club. The Cuttings were friends of novelist Edith Wharton, who wrote, in memorial, the following about him:

"This ceaseless intellectual curiosity was fed by familiarity with many tongues. It seemed to Bayard Cutting a perfectly natural and simple thing to learn a new language for the sake of reading a new book; and he did it, as the French say, 'in playing.' His gift of tongues undoubtedly contributed to his open-mindedness and increased the flexibility of his sympathies. It was the key to different points of view, and that key he was never weary of turning."

In October 1905, they reportedly moved to St. Moritz, Switzerland under the notion that the Swiss mountains would improve his failing health, although this was later denied by his family who said, instead, they moved to visit his wife's family members.

He later moved to Milan where he served as Deputy United States Consul at Milan for several years. While in Italy, Ambassador Lloyd Carpenter Griscom dispatched Cutting to Messina following the 1908 earthquake to establish a consulate and where he was one of the first foreigners to arrive. Cutting "did much to relieve the suffering there." In 1909, he was appointed the Secretary of Embassy at Tangier, a city in northwestern Morocco that is the capital of the Tanger-Tetouan-Al Hoceima region. However, Harvard offered him a lectureship on British Colonial Government beginning in the fall of 1910, and he, therefore, resigned as Secretary to prepare for his teaching. Cutting then traveled to Egypt to study the British Government there before planning on moving on to other British Colonies.

== Personal life ==
After denying reports of their engagement in February 1901, Cutting was married to Lady Sybil Marjorie Cuffe (1879–1943) at All Saints' Church in London, England on April 30, 1901. Lady Sybil was the youngest daughter of Irish peer and barrister, Hamilton Cuffe, 5th Earl of Desart, who served as the last Lord Lieutenant of Kilkenny, and his wife, Lady Margaret Joan Lascelles, a daughter of Henry Lascelles, 4th Earl of Harewood. Her older sister, Lady Joan Elizabeth Mary Cuffe, was married to the British courtier, Sir Harry Lloyd-Verney. Together, William and Lady Sybil were the parents of one daughter:

- Iris Margaret Cutting (1902–1988), an author of many books who married Antonio Origo, an illegitimate son of Marchese Clemente Origo, in March 1924.

After a ten-day illness, Cutting died of tuberculosis at age 31 on March 10, 1910, in Aswan, Egypt. After his body was returned to the United States, he was buried at Green-Wood Cemetery in Brooklyn, New York.

Before he died, he wrote to his wife that he wanted their young daughter, Iris, to grow up in Italy, "free from all this national feeling which makes people so unhappy. Bring her up somewhere where she does not belong." Lady Sybil and her daughter settled in Florence, Italy; buying the Villa Medici in Fiesole, one of the city's most spectacular villas. There they formed a close friendship with Bernard Berenson, who lived not far away at I Tatti.

In 1918 his widow remarried to architectural historian Geoffrey Scott, of the Berensonain circle. They divorced in 1926, and she remarried to Percy Lubbock, an essayist, critic, and biographer. Lady Sybil was also a writer and published On Ancient Ways; A Winter Journey in 1928, and The Child in the Crystal in 1939.

=== Honors and legacy ===
Due to his efforts with the Italian earthquake, the American Red Cross awarded him, along with Ambassador Griscom and Commander Reginald R. Belknap, its Red Cross gold medal of merit in 1909.

In 1910, a number of people jointly gave $25,000 to endow a Harvard fellowship "in memory of the late William Bayard Cutting, Jr., of New York, of the Class of 1900." The fellowship was "to be reserved exclusively for men of the highest intellectual attainments and of the greatest promise as productive scholars. It [was] never to be given to the best among any number of applicants, unless the best man is one of the first-rate and well-rounded excellence."
