= Bayard Cutting Arboretum State Park =

State park in New York, United States

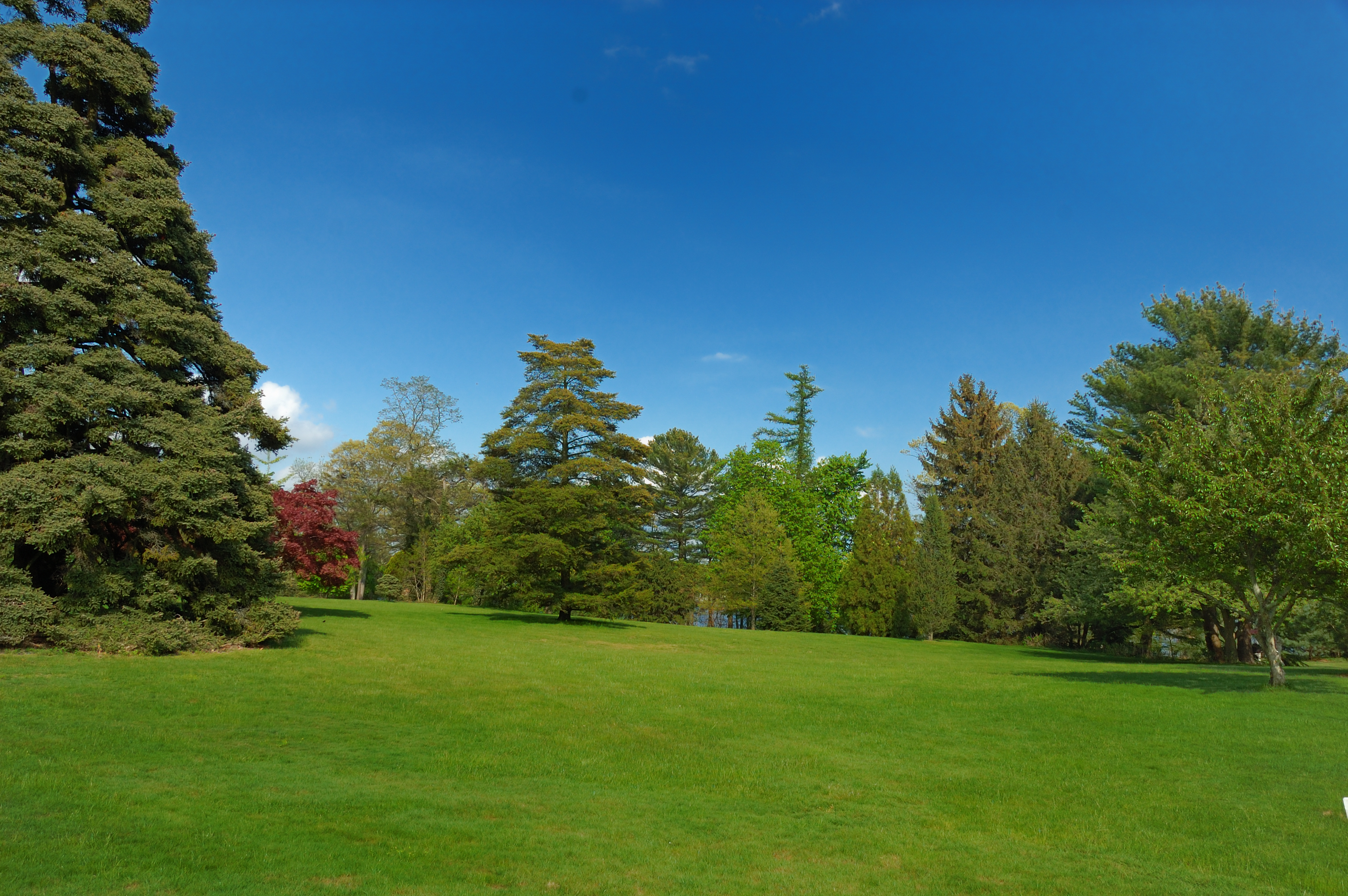
- View of the Bayard Cutting Arboretum

- Location within New York
- Type: State park, arboretum
- Location: 440 Montauk Highway; Great River, New York
- Nearest city: Great River, New York
- Coordinates: 40°44′9.1″N 73°09′44.5″W
- Area: 691 acres (2.80 km^{2})
- Created: 1936
- Operator: New York State Office of Parks, Recreation and Historic Preservation
- Visitors: 477,232 (in 2024)
- Open: All year
- Website: Bayard Cutting Arboretum State Park
- Bayard Cutting Estate
- U.S. National Register of Historic Places
- U.S. Historic district
- Area: 750 acres (300 ha)
- Architect: Charles Haight, Frederick Law Olmsted
- Architectural style: Tudor
- NRHP reference No.: 73001271
- Added to NRHP: October 2, 1973

Bayard Cutting Arboretum State Park is a 691-acre (2.80 km^{2}) state park located in the hamlet of Great River, New York, on Long Island. The park includes an arboretum designed by Frederick Law Olmsted for William Bayard Cutting in 1886, as well as a mansion designed by Charles C. Haight. Today Bayard Cutting Arboretum State Park is one of the last remaining estates on the South Shore of Long Island. It has been listed on the National Register of Historic Places since 1973 as a historic district. Robert Fulton Cutting, known as the “first citizen of New York” and his wife Helen Suydam Cutting, niece to Caroline Astor, would frequent the manor house and estate as both William and Robert were brothers. Together Robert and William brought the sugar beet industry to the United States.

== History ==
William "Bayard" Cutting, a prominent New York City lawyer and financier along with his younger brother Robert (previously mentioned) purchased over 900 acres in the village of Oakdale from George Lorillard in 1884. The two Cutting brothers split the property originally known as Westbrook Farm with Robert Fulton Cutting retaining Lorillard's house and William Bayard Cutting building another. Both brothers were the grandsons of Robert Cutting, who had been Robert Fulton's partner in the ferry from Brooklyn to New York. They were also both direct descendants of the prominent William Bayard Jr. a close friend to Alexander Hamilton.

In 1895, Bayard and his brother installed a golf course at Westbrook, which was the first private golf course in the United States. The course was designed by Willie Dunn who had also created the Shinnecock Hills golf course in Southampton. It was a nine-hole course and for many years hosted the Westbrook Cup tournament.

Other changes to the estate took place when a fire in 1895 burned down many of the farm buildings. Stanford White was commissioned to draw the plans for a modern dairy, Westbrook Farms, with many innovative features.

In 1899, a hunting lodge, made only of cedar logs, was built on the property. There was an earthen floor and a stone fireplace complete with irons and spits. Wooden pegs were used as hangers. The cabin was modeled after those used by pioneers.

Bayard Cutting died on March 1, 1912, due to complications from heart disease. He was 62 years old and buried in the family vault at Greenwood Cemetery in Brooklyn. After his death, his widow, Mrs. Olivia Cutting, inherited over $9 million from his estate when it was probated in 1913.

== Mansion ==
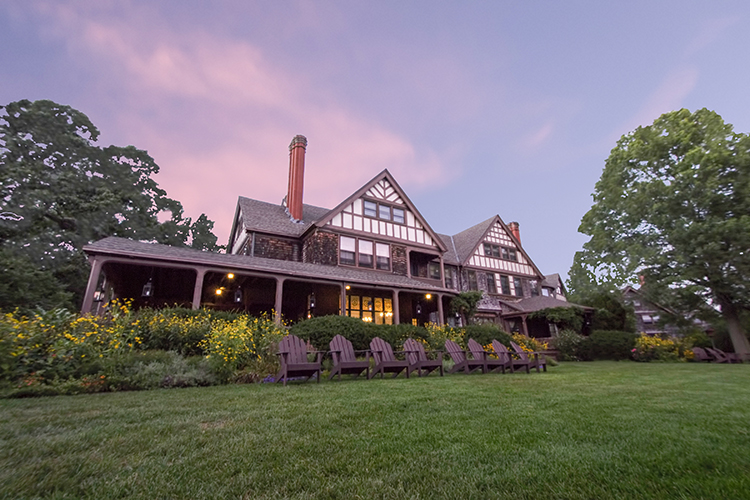
Manor at Bayard Cutting Arboretum

Boasting 19,000 square feet, the “summer home” of William and his wife at the heart of the park, Westbrook, is modeled on a Tudor-style English country house. The interior of the 60-room mansion features large pieces of oak furniture, stained-glass windows from Louis Comfort Tiffany, and imported fireplaces. Views of the Connetquot River can be seen from across the open lawn.

Most recently, one of the family bedroom’s was a filming location for HBO Max’s The Gilded Age. The Martin Scorsese’s period drama “The Age of Innocence” was also filmed partially on the vast estate.

There is also a designated shower that was built specifically for the Cutting’s friend Nobel Prize Winner Dr. Albert Schweitzer who was not a fan of baths.

== Landscape ==
Bayard began developing the grounds of his home in 1887 with the assistance of Frederick Law Olmsted with a focus on the landscape's natural beauty.Charles Sprague Sargent, director of the Arnold Arboretum in Boston, who had worked with Olmsted, advised Cutting in developing the extensive conifer collection north of the carriage house. Cutting also was in touch with Ernest Wilson, who was sponsored by Harvard University to bring back tree specimens from China.

The original rhododendrons and first tree specimens at the arboretum came from nurseries in England in the early 1900s. Other trees in the park included: firs, spruces, pines, hemlock, cedar and yews originating from Europe, Spain, Greece, Japan, China and Africa.

== Park ==
On June 18, 1936, the Long Island State Park Commission was given 200 acres of the Cutting estate for use as an arboretum by Mrs. Bayard James, daughter of William Cutting, with the stipulation that she and her mother keep full use of the property as long as either is living. Both the house and property were given to the people of Long Island "to provide an oasis of beauty and quiet for the pleasure, rest, and refreshment of those who delight in outdoor beauty; and to bring about a greater appreciation and understanding of the value and importance of informal planting". The Long Island State Park Commission took over control of the park on Dec. 1, 1952. An endowment fund of $1,000,000 had been set up by Mrs. Cutting who died November 15, 1949 Alterations were made to the property including the addition of bathrooms and parking lots and adding a tearoom to the main house. Improvements were also made to roads and paths.

The park officially opened to the public on May 15, 1954. In keeping with the purpose of the gift, the commission decided that there would be no picnicking, bathing, horseback riding or playgrounds allowed on the property. More parking spaces were added the following year to accommodate more visitors. Extensions were also made to trails and walks

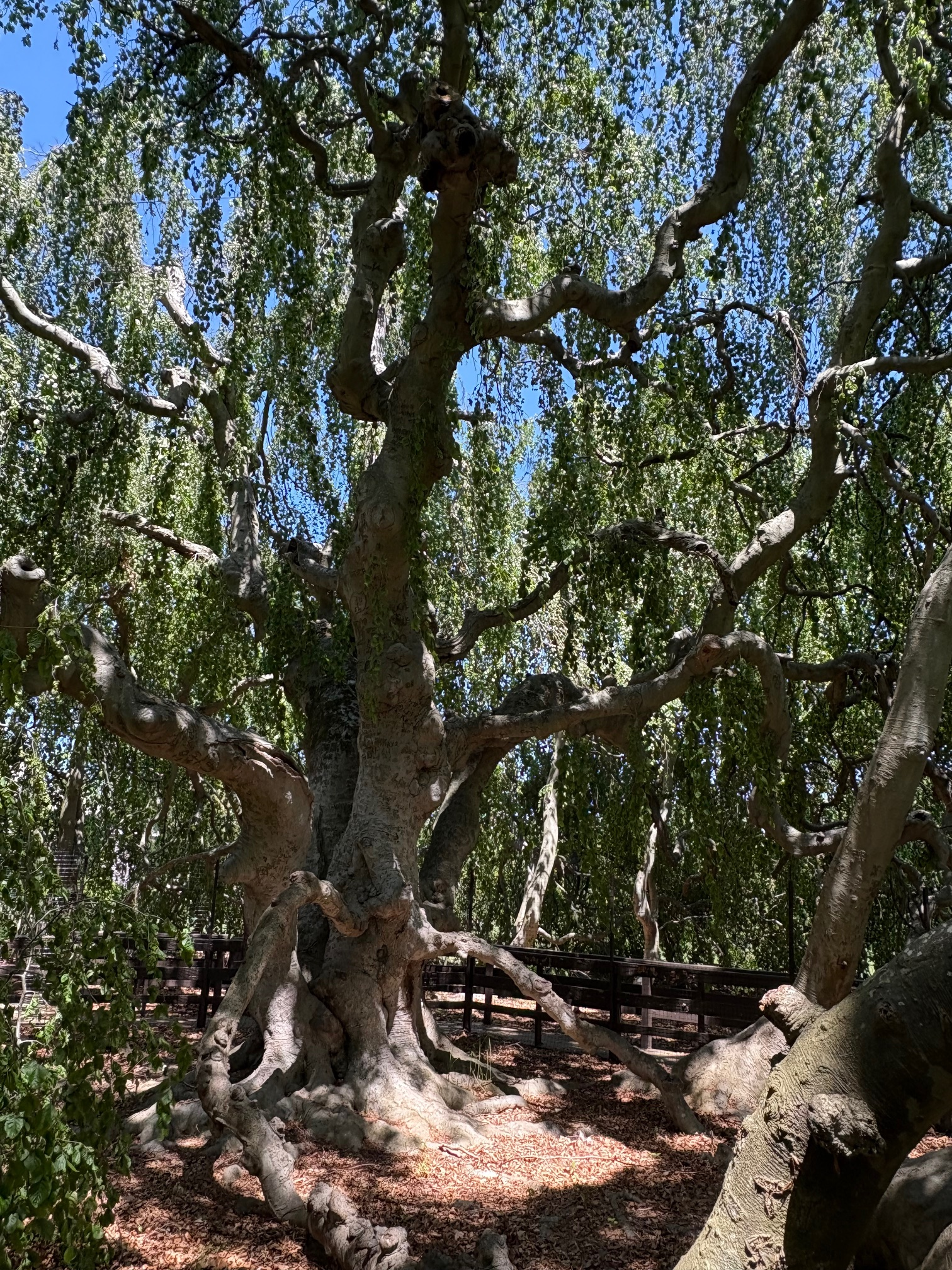
Weeping beech at Bayard Cutting Arboretum

Today, the park has a variety of nature trails including: the Woodland Garden Walk, the Perennial Garden Walk, the River Walk, the New Pinetum Walk, the Old Pinetum Walk, the Holly Walk, the Paradise Island Walk and the Royce Rhododendron Walk. There are recreational programs and a food and a gift shop at Westbrook.

The Bayard Cutting Arboretum Horticultural Society, founded in 1974, donates profits of its activities to help support the Westbrook Manor. As part of its fundraising activities, the organization operates Granny's Attic located in the lower carriage house and hosts two plant sales a year. Recent Westbrook Manor projects funded in part by the Horticultural Society include: porch restoration, porch pillars restoration, new carpeting, Tiffany windows restoration and floor sanding.

Two hurricanes affected the state park. In 1954, Hurricane Carol destroyed over 70 trees but much more damage was done when over 1,000 of some of the most mature trees were lost in Hurricane Gloria in 1985.

The Bayard Cutting Arboretum farm was established in 2012. It was the first Community Supported Agriculture (CSA) program in the New York State park system. The farm produces over 150 varieties of vegetables and berries and also grows culinary herbs and flowers. There are 150 hens providing eggs to members of the CSA program.

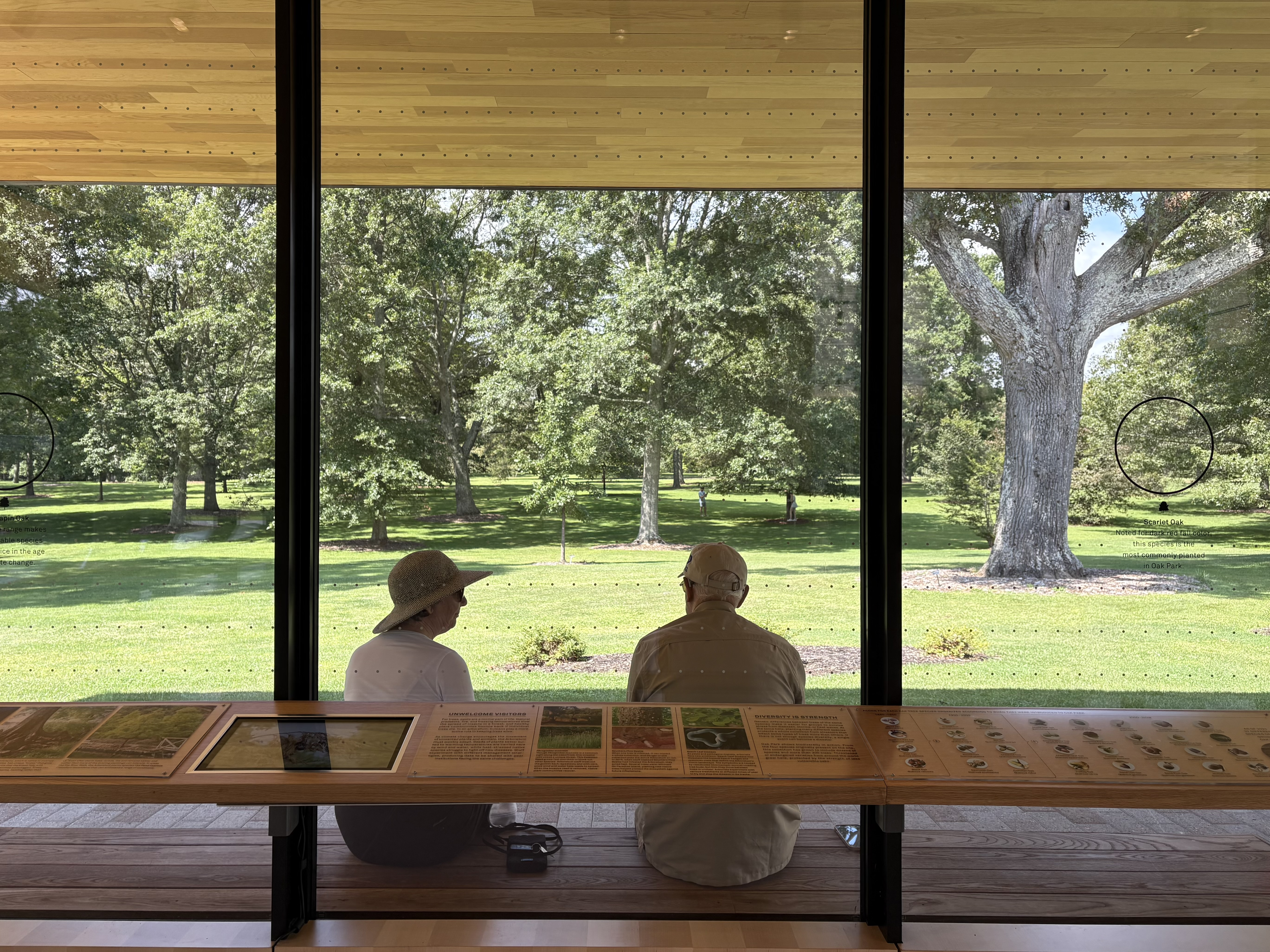
View of Oak Park from visitor center

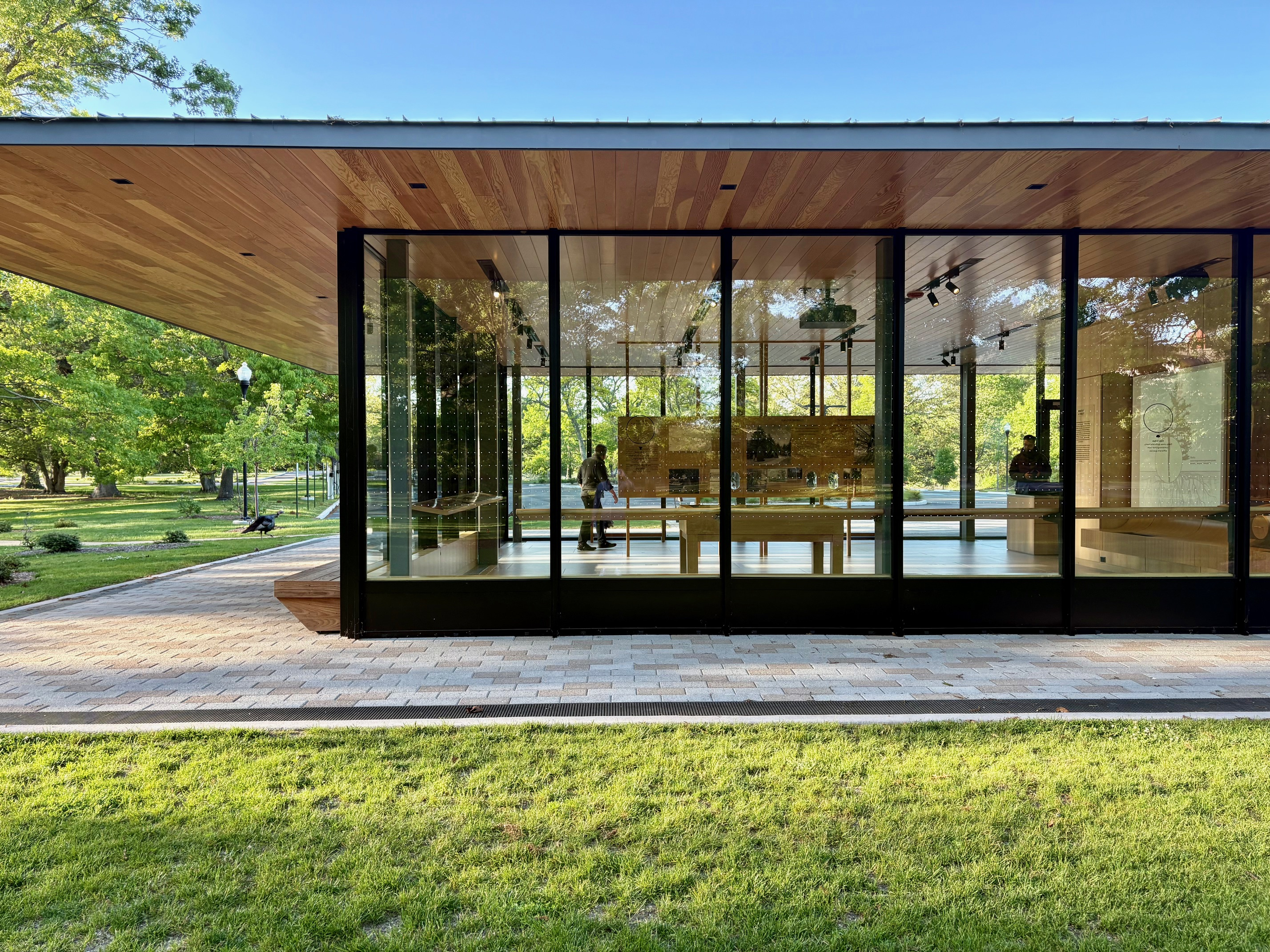
Bayard Cutting Arboretum Visitor Center

Two gardens have been restored by the noted public park designer Lynden B. Miller. The park winter hours (November–March) are 10 a.m. to 4 p.m. Summer hours (April–October) are 10 a.m. to 5 p.m. In 2023, construction began on a new, glass-walled visitor center designed by MBB Architects. The visitor center, which includes a rooftop solar array, opened in 2024 and includes exhibits on trees and ecology.

== See also ==
- Westbrook, Suffolk County, New York
- List of New York state parks
- List of botanical gardens in the United States
