= Justine Ward =

American musical educator (1879–1975)

- Born: Justine Bayard Cutting; August 7, 1879; Morristown, New Jersey, U.S.
- Died: November 27, 1975 (aged 96); Washington, D.C., U.S.
- Spouse: George Cabot Ward (m. 1901, divorced)
- Parent(s): William Bayard Cutting; Olivia Peyton Murray
- Relatives: William Bayard Cutting Jr. (brother); Bronson Murray Cutting (brother); Henry James (brother-in-law); Iris Origo (niece); Elise Justine Bayard (grandmother)

Justine Bayard Ward (née Cutting; Morristown, New Jersey, August 7, 1879 – Washington, D.C., November 27, 1975) was a musical educator who developed a system for teaching music to children known as the Ward Method.

== Early life ==
Justine Bayard Cutting was born on August 7, 1879, in Morristown, New Jersey, to William Bayard Cutting (1850–1912), a founder of the Metropolitan Opera, and Olivia Peyton Cutting (née Murray; 1855–1949). Her siblings included William Bayard Cutting Jr. (1878–1910), who married Lady Sybil Marjorie Cuffe and was the father of Iris Origo, Bronson Murray Cutting (1888–1935), a U.S. Senator from New Mexico, and Olivia Murray Cutting (1892–1963), who married Henry James (1879–1947).

Her paternal grandparents were Fulton Cutting (1816–1875) and Elise Justine Bayard (1823–1852), the poet. She was descended from the Bayard, Schuyler and Van Cortlandt families of Colonial New York, and was a direct descendant of Stephen Van Rensselaer IV, the last patroon of the Manor of Rensselaerswyck, and William Bayard Jr. (1761–1826), a prominent New York City banker.

== Career ==
She was the first woman in the world to develop an American elementary music education method, which predates the Kodály, Orff, and Dalcroze methods, and contains all the same basic elements, with an emphasis on music literacy and aesthetic interpretation.

The Ward method of music education was created in the early part of the twentieth century to promote the use of liturgical chant by teaching children vocal music reading skills. Its author, Justine Bayard Ward, was a newcomer to the Catholic Church and to the field of education, yet her approach proved successful and spread throughout the United States, Europe and other parts of the world. The ancient tradition of choral training in the Church, Ward's upbringing, her musical training and aesthetic inclinations, and her zeal in furthering the liturgical and musical reforms of Pius X fostered the ideal environment for the creation of the Ward method.

Evidence shows that the materials and procedures were largely appropriations of pre-existing ideas. For example, the work in sight-singing was taken from the Galin-Paris-Chevé school, which flourished in nineteenth-century France, and the educational philosophy originated from her publisher, Rev. Thomas Shields. Ward's mentor, Rev. John Young, S.J., had combined bel canto vocal technique with Chevé exercises and, under Shields's guidance, Ward reshaped it. Separation of musical elements, principally rhythm and pitch, and graduated exercises were key ingredients Ward inherited from Chevé. Students learned accurate pitch discrimination through daily sight-singing drills where numbers corresponded to the sung solfège syllables in moveable "do."

Justine Ward's contributions lie in skillfully incorporating the Galin-Paris-Chevé sight-singing drills, Young's vocal training, and Shields' theories of aesthetics and childhood development to attain her goal of teaching children music of quality. The repertoire consisted of classical melodies, European folk tunes, and Gregorian chant. Another original contribution was the inclusion of the Solesmes method of rhythm, and the teaching of its rhythms through body movement; Ward had traveled to France specifically to learn from the Benedictines of Solesmes.

The Ward method spread through several avenues. Catholic Education Press began systematic publication of textbooks in the 1910s. Leaders in Catholic education were won over by demonstrations led by Justine Ward. More importantly, the Ward method spread through teacher training courses. It evolved in subsequent publications largely due to her recasting the material to reflect trends in music education. The newer rhythmic theories in Gregorian chant, which depart from the Solesmes method that Ward championed, are one of the leading reasons many still oppose using the Ward Method. This ignores the musical literacy contribution Ward made to elementary music education methods in the United States, and places all emphasis on chant. "The Ward method teaches students how to sing and read music with ease and skill. Its predecessors were Rousseau and Galin-Paris-Chevé, who developed a method of reading music in numbers for solfege, rather than beginning with the traditional staff. Ward evolved a method that incorporated staff notation so that there is no gap in learning. This method is designed with progressive education ideals in mind, such as learning through the discovery of facts in sequential steps." While the Solesmes method is quite simplistic, due to being the pioneer of modern chant revitalization, it is easy to learn and teach to children and adults, making it an ideal spring board for later learning. The Ward Method remains an outstanding method of teaching music literacy, with or without chant.

== Personal life ==
In 1901, she married George Cabot Ward (1876–1936). They divorced and the marriage was later annulled.

Ward died at her home, in Washington, D.C., on November 27, 1975.

=== Legacy ===
In 1944, the Order of Malta awarded her the Croce di Benemerenza, and from Pope Pius XII, she received the Cross Pro Ecclesia et Pontifica. She held honorary doctorates from the Pontifical Institute of Sacred Music in Rome and Catholic University.

Located just behind the Basilica of the National Shrine of the Immaculate Conception, the School of Music building of the Catholic University of America was partially donated by and named for her.
