= Elise Justine Bayard =

American poet

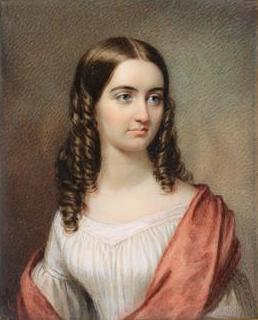
- Born: Elise Justine Bayard; August 16, 1823; Fishkill, New York
- Died: 1853; New York City, U.S.
- Spouse: Fulton Cutting (m. 1849)
- Children: William Bayard Cutting; Robert Fulton Cutting
- Parent(s): Robert Bayard; Elizabeth McEvers
- Relatives: Justine B. Cutting (granddaughter); William Bayard Cutting Jr. (grandson); Bronson M. Cutting (grandson); See Bayard family

Elise Justine Bayard Cutting (August 16, 1823 – 1853) was an American poet from New York.

== Early life ==
Elise Justine Bayard was born in Fishkill, New York, Bayard was the daughter of Robert Bayard (1797–1878) and Elizabeth McEvers, both members of old New York families. Her father, along with her uncle, Robert Fulton, were partners in the ferry from Brooklyn to New York. Another uncle was Stephen Van Rensselaer IV, the last patroon of the Manor of Rensselaerswyck. Her paternal grandfather, William Bayard Jr. (1761–1826), was a prominent New York City banker who was a close friend to Alexander Hamilton, who died at Bayard's home after his famous duel with Aaron Burr.

== Career ==
Bayard Cutting penned what scholars have called "unremarkable" verse about common subjects. She published frequently in The Knickerbocker and the Literary World and was identified as a promising young author in a column written by Sarah Josepha Hale. It is difficult to definitively assign many poems to her as they were often unsigned or only initialed with her maiden initials, E.J.B., or her married ones, E.B.C..

An example of her sonnet is:

Sprung from the arid rock devoid of soil,
In vig'rous life I saw one blade of wheat,
Bearing its precious grain, full-lobed and sweet,
Remote from eye of him whose lusty toil
In other harvest recompense hath found;
And it seemed good to me that labour should
Beyond its aim or asking thus abound,
While reaping to itself its purchased food:
So, too, from him, who the prolific thought
Sows in the cultured field of intellect,
A wandering breath its course may intersect,
And bear an embryo with rich promise fraught
Within some barren soul to germinate,
And fill with fruitful life what else were desolate.

== Personal life ==
On February 13, 1849, she married Fulton Cutting (1816–1875), the son of William Cutting (1773–1820) and Gertrude Livingston (1778–1864). Her husband, Fulton, a lawyer and vestryman at Trinity Church, was the younger brother of Francis Brockholst Cutting (1804–1870), a U.S. Representative from New York, the nephew of Henry Walter Livingston (1768–1810), and the grandson of Walter Livingston (1740–1797), and their sons were:

- William Bayard Cutting (1850–1912), a financier
- Robert Fulton Cutting (1852–1934), a financier

She died in New York. Elise's papers are in the library of the New York Historical Society.
