= Edward Livingston (clubman) =

- Born: April 4, 1834; Albany, New York, U.S.
- Died: December 18, 1906 (aged 72); Peekskill, New York, U.S.
- Spouse: Frances Hazeltine (m. 1868, died)
- Children: 2
- Parent(s): Edward Livingston; Sarah Ray Lansing Livingston
- Relatives: See Livingston family

Edward Livingston (April 4, 1834 – December 18, 1906) was an American businessman and clubman who was prominent in society during the Gilded Age.

== Early life ==
Livingston was born on April 4, 1834, in Albany, New York. He was the youngest of seven children born to Edward Livingston (1796–1840) and Sarah Ray (née Lansing) Livingston (1797–1848). Among his siblings, Edward was the only to marry and have children live to adulthood. His siblings were Maria Lansing, Cornelia Lansing, Frances "Fanny" S., Sarah Lansing, Philip Henry, and John Lansing Livingston. His father was an attorney who served as District Attorney of Albany County as well as the Clerk and Speaker of the New York State Assembly.

His maternal grandparents were Cornelia (née Ray) Lansing and John Ten Eyck Lansing Jr., the former Speaker of the New York State Assembly and Chancellor of New York from 1801 to 1814. His aunt, Jane Lansing, was married to U.S. Representative Rensselaer Westerlo (1776–1851), and another aunt, Frances Lansing, was married to Jacob Livingston Sutherland. His paternal grandparents were Philip Henry Livingston (a grandson of Continental Congressman and Signer of the Declaration of Independence Philip Livingston) and Maria (née Livingston) Livingston (a daughter of Walter Livingston, the 1st Speaker of the New York State Assembly).

== Career ==
Livingston was a businessman involved in the "importation and sale of railroad materials" including the Shelby Iron Company, Detroit Steel and Spring Company, and Brierfield Iron & Coal Co. He entered into various partnerships with Charles L. Perkins, Henry A. V. Post, and Francis Vose, between 1858 and 1880, known variously as Perkins, Livingston & Co. and Perkins, Livingston & Post.

=== Society life ===
In February 1892, Livingston, by then a widower, was included in Ward McAllister's "Four Hundred", purported to be an index of New York's best families, published in The New York Times. Conveniently, 400 was the number of people that could fit into Mrs. Astor's ballroom. Livingston was a member of the Union Club and the Metropolitan Club, and the Society of the Cincinnati.

== Personal life ==
On Thursday, October 8, 1868, Livingston was married to Frances Clarissa "Fanny" Hazeltine, by the Rev. Dr. Frederic Dan Huntington at Emmanuel Episcopal Church in Boston. Fanny was the daughter of Mayo Hazeltine and Frances (née Williamson) Hazletine of Boston, and the granddaughter of Gov. William D. Williamson. They lived at 17 East 74th Street, and had a large estate, comprising several thousand acres, in Manitou (a hamlet in the southwest corner of Philipstown by the Hudson River in Putnam County. Together, they were the parents of:

- Clarisse Hazeltine Livingston (b. 1869), who made her debut in 1887 at which time her father gave her a ball for 600 guests at Delmonico's with a cotillion led by Clarisse and Elliott Roosevelt. The ball cost an estimated $15,000.
- Edward Livingston Jr. (1871–1929), who graduated from Harvard in 1893 and Columbia University Law School in 1896. He married Mabel Drake (1875–1915).

Livingston "dropped dead of heart disease" on the veranda at the home of his friend, D. S. Herrick, in Peekskill, New York, as he was "about to ring the bell" on December 18, 1906.
