= Robert Fulton Cutting =

American lawyer

- Born: June 27, 1852; New York City, New York, U.S.
- Died: September 21, 1934 (aged 82); Tuxedo Park, New York, U.S.
- Education: Columbia University
- Occupations: Real estate developer, sugar beet refiner
- Spouses: Nathalie Charlotte Pendelton Schenck (m. 1874; death 1875) Helen Suydam (m. 1883; death 1919)
- Children: 7
- Parent(s): Fulton Cutting; Elise Justine Bayard
- Relatives: William Bayard Cutting (brother); Francis B. Cutting (uncle)

Robert Fulton Cutting (June 27, 1852 – September 21, 1934), was an American financier and philanthropist known as "the first citizen of New York." Cutting and his brother William started the sugar beet industry in the United States in 1888.

During his life he was known for his fight against Tammany Hall and Republican party bosses. In 1897, he formed the Citizens Union, an organization that studied political issues, developed policies, and presented them to the public to influence politics, particularly around elections. This later became the Bureau of Municipal Research. He was also a vestryman at St. George's Church in Stuyvesant Square. He became President of the Cooper Union in 1914, and served in that position until his death in 1934.

== Early life ==
Cutting was born in New York City on June 27, 1852. He was the second son of Fulton Cutting (1816–1875) and Elise Justine (née Bayard) Cutting (1823–1852). He was the younger brother of William Bayard Cutting, also a financier. Both brothers, through their mother, were direct descendants of William Bayard Jr, a close friend of Alexander Hamilton. The fireplace mantle beside which Hamilton supposedly died is now in the Mayor of New York City’s Mansion.

His paternal grandparents were William Cutting (1773–1820) and Gertrude Livingston (1778–1864), the sister of Henry Walter Livingston, a U.S. Representative from New York, and the daughter of Walter Livingston, the 1st Speaker of the New York State Assembly. He was the nephew of Francis Brockholst Cutting, also a U.S. Representative from New York. His maternal grandfather, Robert Bayard, was Robert Fulton's partner. Cutting and Fulton were brothers-in-law who had married Livingston sisters. Cutting direct ancestors included members from the Stuyvesant, Bayard, Schuyler and Van Cortlandt families of colonial New York.

Cutting graduated from Columbia University, where he was a member of the Philolexian Society.

== Career ==
In 1888, Cutting and his brother William started the sugar beet industry in the United States.

In 1895, Cutting and his brother laid out a golf course at Westbrook, known to be the first private golf course in the United States.

=== Society life and philanthropy ===
Cutting was a member of the Century Club, City Club of New York, and the Tuxedo Club, among others. He also served as president of Cooper Union, the Society for the Improvement Condition of the Poor, and the Metropolitan Opera and Real Estate Company.

However, one of his biggest contributions was after the death of his wife Helen Suydam Cutting from cancer. As stated by an article in TIME magazine, “Financier Robert Fulton Cutting modestly stayed away from last week's meeting of the American Society for the Control of Cancer in Manhattan…Contributions have been slow and from too few people. Financier Cutting knew that, but instead of coming to the cancer society meeting last week, he sent a letter. Financier Thomas W. Lament, who was there, read the letter aloud: "I write to say that I will contribute the last $250,000 of the $1,000,000 endowment fund which your society is endeavoring to raise, if the whole amount is subscribed by Oct. 1. When $750,000 is paid or subscribed, I will pay the $250,000 of my pledge."

Tragically, one of his own daughters, Ruth Hunter Cutting Auchincloss would succumb to the same fate as her mother.

His society life, along with his brother, was prominent one as both brothers were considered founding members of the Jekyll Island Club and through his aunt-in-law (Caroline Astor) by marriage was a member of the highly prestigious “400.”

== Personal life ==
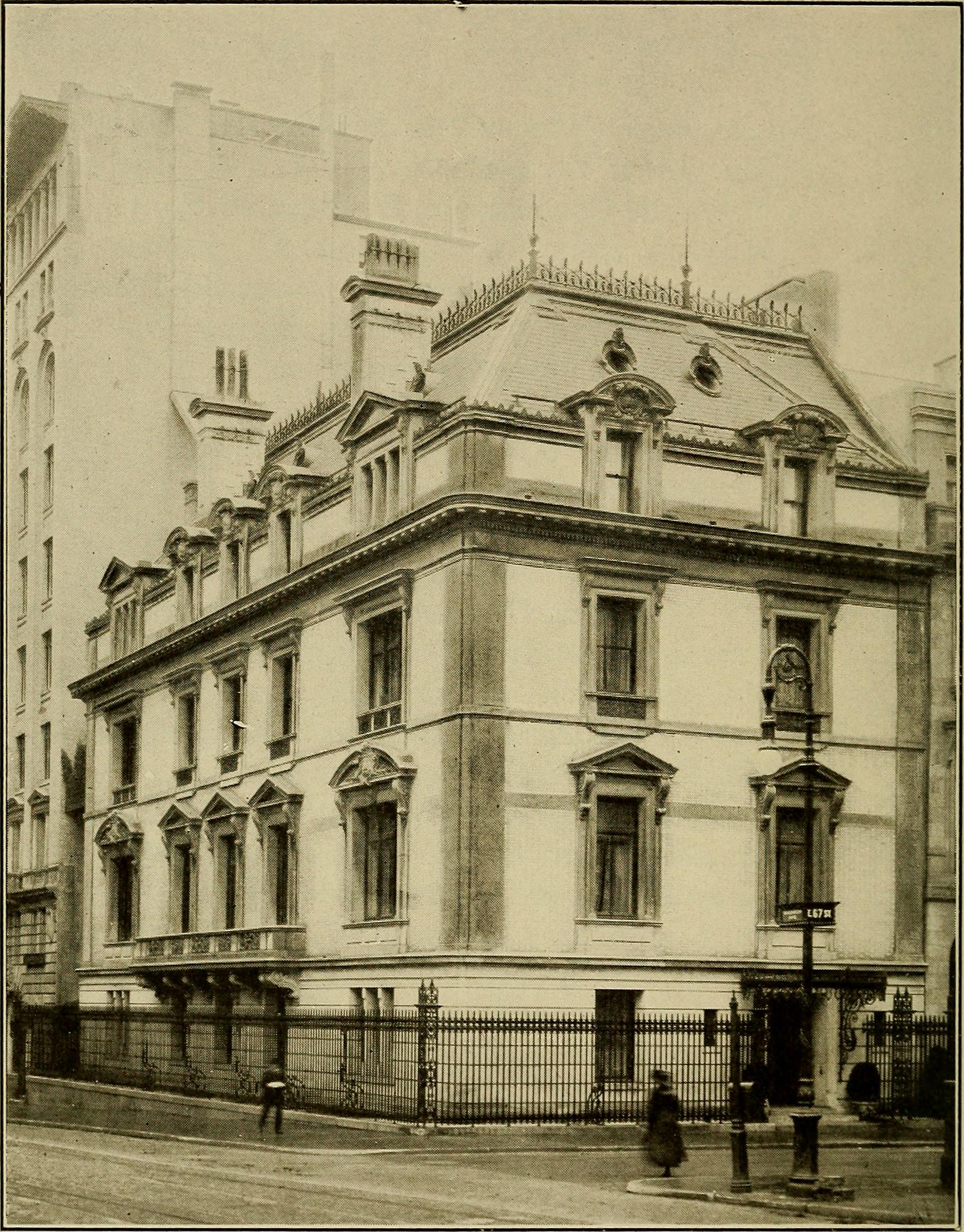
Cutting's home at 24 East 67th Street (demolished in 1962)

Cutting was married twice. His first marriage was to Nathalie Charlotte Pendleton Schenck (1852–1875) on June 9, 1874. She was the daughter of Noah Hunt Schenck and Anna Pierce (née Pendleton) Schenck, and the sister of Anna Pendleton Schenck, who established the first female architectural firm in New York City along with Marcia Mead. She died a year after their marriage, and they were the parents of one son:

- Robert Bayard Cutting (1875–1918), a Harvard graduate who died in Paris during World War I.

After her death, he married secondly to Helen Suydam (1858–1919), the daughter of Charles Suydam and Anna White (née Schermerhorn) Suydam, on January 25, 1883. His wife was the sister of Walter Lispenard Suydam, the granddaughter of Abraham Schermerhorn, and the niece of Caroline Schermerhorn, who was married to William Backhouse Astor Jr. Together, they were the parents of:

- Helen Suydam Cutting (1883–1971), who married Lucius Kellogg Wilmerding Jr. (1880–1949).
- Elisabeth McEvers Cutting (b. 1885), who married Dr. Stafford McLean in 1916. She later married Neville Jay Booker.
- Robert Fulton Cutting (1886–1967), who married Mary Josephine Amory (1887–1971) in 1914.
- Charles Suydam Cutting (1889–1972), who was the first white Christian to ever enter the Forbidden City in Lhasa.
- Ruth Hunter Cutting (1896–1948), who married Reginald LaGrange Auchincloss (1891–1984), brother of U.S. Representative James Coats Auchincloss.
- Schermerhorn Cutting (1897–1897), who died young.

In 1884, he purchased 724 Fifth Avenue along "Vanderbilt Row" as a home for his family in Manhattan. In 1895, however, Cutting purchased property further uptown and hired Ernest Flagg to design a new residence located at 24 East 67th Street, at the corner of Madison Avenue. He also acquired a home in 1889 in the exclusive Tuxedo Park community, a large residence designed by Bruce Price in 1887 and located on Tower Hill Road at the intersection of Clubhouse Road and Serpentine Road.

Cutting died at the age of 82 at his home in Tuxedo Park on September 21, 1934. His funeral, attended by over 500 people, was held at St. Georges. He was buried at Green-Wood Cemetery in Brooklyn, New York. Following his death, Dr. William Jay Schieffelin paid tribute to Cutting during a radio address, stating "Robert Fulton Cutting devoted his life to advance social justice; he early saw that voters should disregard national parties in selecting city officers. New York owes much to his leadership in creating a prevailing public opinion in favor of non-partisan government. He have his devoted service and generous support to the Committee of Seventy, the City Club, the Bureau of Municipal Research and the Citizens Union--of which he was the first chairman."

== Notes ==
Academic offices
Preceded by John Edward Parsons	President of Cooper Union; 1914 — 1934	Succeeded by Gano Dunn
