= William Bayard Cutting =

American lawyer

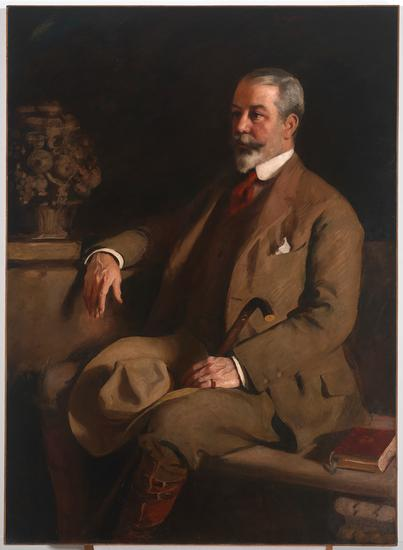
- Born: January 12, 1850; New York City, U.S.
- Died: March 1, 1912 (aged 62)
- Education: Columbia College, 1869, 1871
- Occupations: Attorney, financier, real estate developer, sugar beet refiner
- Spouse: Olivia Peyton Murray (m. 1877)
- Children: William Bayard Cutting Jr. Justine Bayard Cutting; Bronson Murray Cutting; Olivia Murray Cutting
- Parent(s): Fulton Cutting; Elise Justine Bayard
- Relatives: Robert Fulton Cutting (brother); Robert Cutting (grandfather); Robert Bayard (grandfather); Francis B. Cutting (uncle)

William Bayard Cutting (January 12, 1850 – March 1, 1912), a member of New York's merchant aristocracy, was an attorney, financier, real estate developer, sugar beet refiner and philanthropist. Cutting and his brother Fulton started the sugar beet industry in the United States in 1888. He was a builder of railroads, operated the ferries of New York City, and developed part of the south Brooklyn waterfront, Red Hook.

== Early life ==
Cutting was born in New York City on January 12, 1850. He was the son of Fulton Cutting (1816–1875) and Elise Justine Bayard (1823–1852). He was the brother of Robert Fulton Cutting (1852–1934), a financier.

His paternal grandparents were William Cutting (1773–1820) and Gertrude Livingston (1778–1864), the sister of Henry Walter Livingston, a U.S. Representative from New York, and the daughter of Walter Livingston, the 1st Speaker of the New York State Assembly. He was the nephew of Francis Brockholst Cutting, also a U.S. Representative from New York. His maternal grandfather, Robert Bayard, was Robert Fulton's partner. Cutting and Fulton were brothers-in-law who had married Livingston sisters. Cutting ancestors included members from the Stuyvesant, Bayard, Schuyler and Van Cortlandt families of colonial New York.

Cutting attended, studied law and graduated from Columbia College.

== Career ==
Cutting, a lawyer, assisted his grandfather, Robert Bayard, in the management of his railroad company. In addition, W. Bayard Cutting continued to operate the ferry system of New York City and the city of Brooklyn.

In 1895, Cutting and his brother laid out a golf course at Westbrook, known to be the first private golf course in the United States.

=== Society life ===
In 1892, Cutting and his wife were included in Ward McAllister's "Four Hundred", purported to be an index of New York's best families, published in The New York Times. Conveniently, 400 was the number of people that could fit into Mrs. Astor's ballroom.

Cutting was a member of the famous Jekyll Island Club (a.k.a. The Millionaires Club) on Jekyll Island, Georgia. He was also a founding member of the good government organization, the City Club of New York. Cutting also was one of the founders of the New York Metropolitan Opera.

His Long Island estate along the west bank of the Connetquot River, purchased from George L. Lorillard in 1884, and the country house called "Westbrook" which he built there, are now the Bayard Cutting Arboretum, in Great River, New York.

== Personal life ==
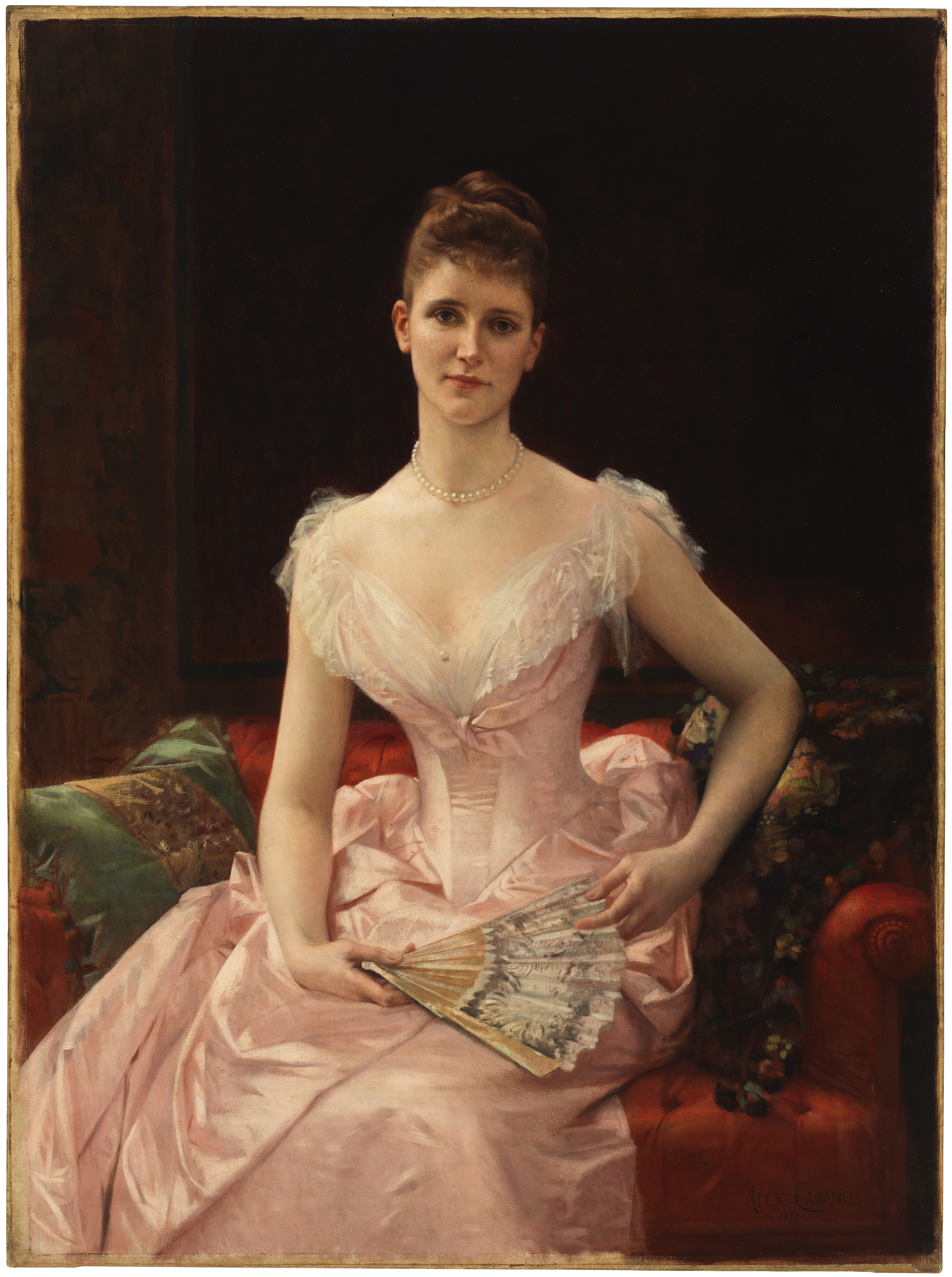
Olivia Peyton Murray Cutting

On April 26, 1877, he married Olivia Peyton Murray (1855–1949), the daughter of Bronson Murray of Murray Hill, New York. They had four children:

- William Bayard Cutting Jr. (1878–1910), who was secretary to the U.S. embassy to the Court of St. James's. On April 30, 1901, he married Lady Sybil Marjorie Cuffe, daughter of Hamilton Cuffe, 5th Earl of Desart and Lady Margaret Joan Lascelles.
- Justine Bayard Cutting (1879–1975), who married George Cabot Ward in 1901. She developed the Ward Method of music education as a way to teach sight-singing to children in Catholic schools in order to promote Gregorian chant.
- Bronson Murray Cutting (1888–1935), a U.S. Senator from New Mexico who was killed in an airplane crash.
- Olivia Murray Cutting (1892–1963), who married Henry James (1879–1947), a Pulitzer Prize winner and the son of psychologist William James, in 1917.

Cutting died on March 1, 1912, of acute indigestion while on a train coming back from El Paso, Texas.

=== Descendants ===
Through his eldest son, he was the grandfather of Iris Origo (1902–1988), the author of many books.
