= Francis B. Cutting =

American politician

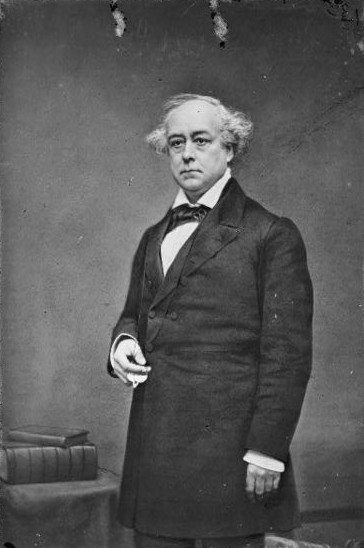

Member of the U.S. House of Representatives from New York's 8th district
- In office March 4, 1853 – March 3, 1855
- Preceded by: Gilbert Dean
- Succeeded by: Abram Wakeman

Member of the New York State Assembly
- In office January 1, 1836 – December 31, 1837

Personal details
- Born: Francis Brockholst Cutting; August 6, 1804 New York City, New York, U.S.
- Died: June 26, 1870 (aged 65) New York City, New York, U.S.
- Resting place: Green-Wood Cemetery, Brooklyn, N.Y.
- Party: Democratic
- Spouse: Anne Markoe Heyward
- Children: 4
- Parent(s): William Cutting; Gertrude Livingston
- Relatives: Robert L. Cutting (brother); Henry Livingston (uncle); Walter Livingston (grandfather)
- Education: Columbia College; Litchfield Law School
- Profession: Politician

Francis Brockholst Cutting (August 6, 1804 – June 26, 1870) was an American lawyer and businessman who served one term as a U.S. Representative from New York from 1853 to 1855.

== Early life ==
Cutting was born in New York City to William Cutting (1773–1820) and Gertrude Cutting (née Livingston; 1778–1864). He was the brother of William Leonard Cutting, Henry Livingston Cutting, Charles Grenville Cutting, Julia Gertrude Cutting, Robert Livingston Cutting, Anne Frances Cutting (who married Baron Alfred Ruebell), Robert Fulton Cutting (who married Elise Justine Bayard), and Walter Livingston Cutting.

He was a nephew of U.S. Representative Henry Walter Livingston, and the grandson of Walter Livingston (the first Speaker of the New York State Assembly) and Cornelia Livingston (née Schuyler). His maternal great-grandfather was Robert Livingston, the third and last Lord of Livingston Manor.

=== Education ===
Cutting attended Bensel School and was also tutored privately. He attended Columbia College before studying law at the Litchfield Law School in Connecticut in 1823.

== Career ==
He was admitted to the bar in 1827 and commenced practice in New York City. As a lawyer, he argued on behalf of Horace Day against Daniel Webster, for Charles Goodyear, in The Great India Rubber Case in 1852. He later attended Webster's memorial.

He was a member of the New York State Assembly (New York Co.) in 1836 and 1837. He served as member of the board of aldermen in 1843.

=== U.S. House of Representatives ===
Cutting was elected as a Democrat to the Thirty-third Congress (March 4, 1853 – March 3, 1855). He sat on the House Committee on the Judiciary.

In 1853, President Pierce gave copies of his inaugural address to Cutting, rather than the Postmaster, fearing the latter and trusting the former. In March 1854, during debate over the Kansas–Nebraska Act, John C. Breckinridge, also a U.S. Representative, made a statement that incensed Cutting, Cutting demanded that he explain or retract it. Breckinridge interpreted Cutting's demand as a challenge to duel. Under code duello, the individual being challenged retained the right to name the weapons used and the distance between the combatants; Breckinridge chose rifles at 60 paces. He also specified that the duel should be held at Silver Spring, the home of his friend Francis Preston Blair. Cutting, who had not intended his initial remark as a challenge, believed that Breckinridge's naming of terms constituted a challenge; he chose to use pistols at a distance of 10 paces. While the two men attempted to clarify who had issued the challenge and who reserved the right to choose the terms, mutual friends resolved the issue, preventing the duel. However, the event was said to inspire a new generation of gentlemen to engage in honor duels. Breckinridge later was selected as the nominee for Vice President of the United States, and the duel was the only memorable thing he had done up that point. He served in that role under President James Buchanan from March 4, 1857 to March 4, 1861.

=== Later career ===
Afterwards he resumed the practice of law. Upon the nomination of Abraham Lincoln, Cutting aided in his election campaign, and was active in supporting the Union.

On May 28, 1861, Cutting wrote to then President Lincoln advising him that "impressions beneficial to our country will be produced by continuing to communicate with Europe, thro' the medium of the Mssrs. Rothschild." Cutting revealed to Lincoln that in order to assist the North in winning the Civil War, they needed the help, and money, from Europe and couldn't ignore the British and French, who were reliant on Southern Cotton. Through social connections, Cutting knew that the elder Baron James Mayer de Rothschild supported the Union over the financial objections of his younger son, Salomon James de Rothschild, who favored the South and disliked Lincoln.

Cutting invested in Railways, shipping, and real estate, amassing a fortune.

== Personal life ==
Cutting was married to Anne Markoe Heyward (1807–1885) of South Carolina. She was the daughter of William Heyward (1779–1846) and Sarah Cruger (1787–1868). They were the parents of:

- Elizabeth Cutting (1828–1831)
- William Cutting (1832–1897), a Harvard graduate who was a Civil War Union Brevet Brigadier General and aide-de-Camp to General Burnside and the founder of the Knickerbocker Club
- Francis Brockholst Cutting Jr. (1834–1869), who married Marion Ramsay (1834–1912). Marion outlived her husband and son.
- Heyward Cutting (1837–1876), who married Lydia S. Mason (b. 1831).

=== Death and aftermath ===
He died at his residence in New York City June 26, 1870. Upon hearing the news, court was adjourned for the day and he was honored by the New York Bar Association. After a funeral at Grace Church in New York, he was buried at the Green-Wood Cemetery in Brooklyn. His estate was worth over $4,000,000 upon his death, with personal property totaling $1,230,767.96, and around $1,300,000 in bonds for Wabash Railroad. According to his will, his estate was split up amongst his sons, Gen. William Cutting, Hayward Cutting, his two surviving sons, and Mrs. Cutting, the widow of his son Francis who predeceased him. After allegations of misdeeds, his son was excused as executor, and his estate was finally settled.

=== Descendants ===
Through his son Francis Brockholst Cutting Jr., who prematurely predeceased him, he was the grandfather of William Cutting Jr. and F. Brockholst Cutting (1861–1896), one of the best-known clubmen and one of the most popular bachelors in society. His grandson, who died at the age of thirty-five without having married, was heavily mourned upon his death.

Through his youngest son, he was the grandfather of Anna Cutting who married Baron Raoul de Vriere (1865–1929), and Henry Mason Cutting (1865–1892), who married Angela Mills (1869–1956).

=== Legacy ===
A room was named for him at the Sea Breeze Hospital in New York City. Funds were also given to honor him at the hospital in Newport, Rhode Island.

U.S. House of Representatives
Preceded by Gilbert Dean	Member of the U.S. House of Representatives from New York's 8th congressional district 1853–1855	Succeeded by Abram Wakeman
