= Bronson M. Cutting =

American politician (1888–1935)

Bronson Cutting
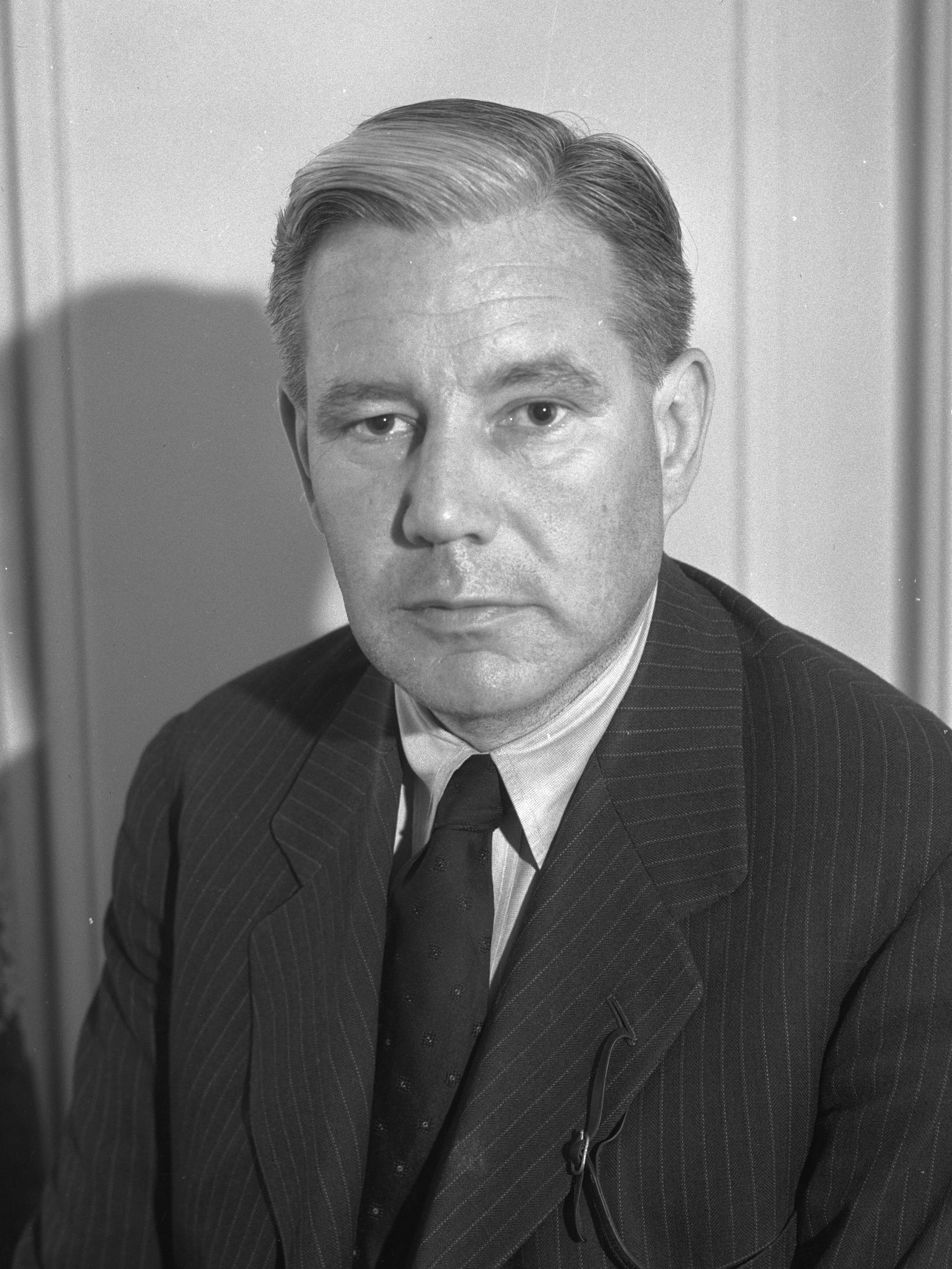
- Cutting in 1935

United States Senator from New Mexico
- In office March 4, 1929 – May 6, 1935
- Preceded by: Octaviano Ambrosio Larrazolo
- Succeeded by: Dennis Chávez
- In office December 29, 1927 – December 6, 1928
- Appointed by: Richard C. Dillon
- Preceded by: Andrieus A. Jones
- Succeeded by: Octaviano Ambrosio Larrazolo

Personal details
- Born: Bronson Murray Cutting; June 23, 1888 Great River, New York, U.S.
- Died: May 6, 1935 (aged 46) near Atlanta, Missouri, U.S.
- Party: Republican
- Relatives: Bayard Cutting (brother); Justine Ward (sister)
- Education: Harvard University (BA)

Military service
- Allegiance: United States
- Branch/service: United States Army
- Years of service: 1917–1918
- Rank: Captain
- Battles/wars: World War I

Bronson Murray Cutting (June 23, 1888 – May 6, 1935) was a newspaper publisher, military attaché, and United States senator representing New Mexico. A prominent progressive Republican, he supported the independence of the Philippines, opposed government censorship, and supported Franklin Roosevelt's candidacy for president in 1932.

== Biography ==
Bronson Cutting was born in Great River, Long Island, New York, on June 23, 1888, at his family's country seat of Westbrook. He was the third of four children born to William Bayard Cutting (1850–1912) and Olivia Peyton Murray (1855–1949).

He attended the common schools and Groton School and graduated from Harvard University in 1910 where he was a member of the Delphic Club. Shortly after graduation, he became an invalid due to recurrent tuberculosis and moved to Santa Fe, New Mexico, at the advice of his doctors to restore his health. He became a newspaper publisher in 1912 and published the Santa Fe New Mexican and El Nuevo Mexicano. From 1912 to 1918 he served as president of the New Mexican Printing Company, and of the Santa Fe New Mexican Publishing Corporation from 1920 until his death.

During World War I, Cutting was commissioned a captain and served as an assistant military attaché of the American Embassy in London, in 1917 and 1918. He was regent of the New Mexico Military Institute in 1920 and served as chairman of the board of commissioners of the New Mexican State Penitentiary in 1925.

=== U.S. senator ===
On December 29, 1927, Cutting was appointed as a Republican to the United States Senate to fill the vacancy caused by the death of Andrieus A. Jones. He served until December 6, 1928, when a duly elected successor, Octaviano Ambrosio Larrazolo, qualified to serve the remainder of the term, which expired March 3, 1929. Cutting was not a candidate in the special election to fill this vacancy, which took place on November 6, 1928, the same day as the general election in which the seat was up for a full six-year term, beginning March 4, 1929. Larrazolo was not a candidate for election to the full term, and Cutting was elected to it, returning to the Senate after only three months away. Cutting was re-elected in 1934, winning a very close race (with 76,226 votes to Democrat Dennis Chavez's 74,944) in a failed year for Republicans.

He was a co-sponsor of the Hare–Hawes–Cutting Independence Act which aimed to grant the Philippine Islands a ten-year commonwealth status with virtually full autonomy, to be followed by the recognition of Filipino independence. The bill was enacted over President Herbert Hoover's veto. However, the law was rejected by the Philippines legislature, and the Tydings–McDuffie Act (authored by Millard Tydings, a Maryland Democrat), was instead passed by Congress and accepted by the Philippines legislature.

==== Freedom of the press ====
Cutting raised the debate on the national level about the government's censorship powers. Via tariff bills dating back to the nineteenth century, the U.S. government, through the Customs Service, had the power to confiscate "obscene" materials arriving to the country. A tariff bill introduced in 1929 sought to expand this power by modifying Section 305 to prohibit printed materials suggesting treason or threatening the life of the president. Senator Cutting, inspired by the complaints of a constituent, opposed the change and attacked Section 305 in its entirety as "irrational, unsound, and un-American."

Through several impassioned speeches, Cutting suggested eliminating Section 305. Ultimately, he was forced to compromise and introduced an amendment removing the references to treason. The amendment passed by only two votes and Cutting received widespread public praise from publishers, librarians, booksellers, authors and civil liberties organizations.

As the tariff bill moved toward final confirmation, various senators, notably Reed Smoot of Utah, attempted to restore Section 305 to its original state, while others proposed further draconian measures. Ultimately, portions of Smoot's amendments were combined with those of other senators to create a compromise. Cutting's efforts to create a national debate about censorship were successful, but are now forgotten because the 1929 tariff bill became known as the Smoot-Hawley Tariff Act.

==== Roosevelt's New Deal and the Chicago plan ====
Crossing party lines, Cutting supported Franklin D. Roosevelt in the 1932 presidential election. Cutting was offered a position in Roosevelt's cabinet as Secretary of the Interior, which he ultimately declined due to his unstable health and instead went to Harold L. Ickes. Cutting played a key role in the political struggles over the reform of banking which Roosevelt undertook while dealing with the Great Depression, and which resulted in the Banking Reform Acts of 1933 and 1935. As a supporter of the Chicago plan proposed by economist Irving Fisher and others at the University of Chicago, Cutting was among a handful of influential senators who might have been able to remove from the private banks their ability to manipulate the money supply by enforcing a 100 percent reserve requirement for all credit creation, as stipulated in the Chicago plan. His death in an airliner crash cut short what may have been his most enduring legacy to the nation.

=== Death and legacy ===
On May 6, 1935, on his way from Albuquerque to Washington, D.C., Cutting died in the crash of TWA Flight 6 (a Douglas DC-2) in bad weather near Atlanta, Missouri.

Senator Cutting's death had national impact, leading Congress to commission the highly controversial Copeland Committee report on air traffic safety.

Dennis Chavez, who had been Cutting's Democratic opponent in 1934, was appointed by the governor to fill Cutting's seat in the Senate.

Cutting is interred in Green-Wood Cemetery in Brooklyn, New York.

== See also ==
- List of members of the United States Congress who died in office (1900–1949)

== Sources ==
- United States Congress. "Bronson M. Cutting (id: C001028)". Biographical Directory of the United States Congress.
- Nolan, M.S. (1999). Fundamentals of Air Traffic Control. Pacific Grove, California: Brooks Cole Publishing Company.

U.S. Senate
Preceded by Andrieus A. Jones	U.S. Senator (Class 1) from New Mexico; 1927–1928; Served alongside: Sam G. Bratton	Succeeded by Octaviano Ambrosio Larrazolo
Preceded by Octaviano Ambrosio Larrazolo	U.S. Senator (Class 1) from New Mexico; 1929–1935; Served alongside: Sam G. Bratton, Carl Hatch	Succeeded by Dennis Chavez
Party political offices
Preceded by Octaviano Ambrosio Larrazolo	Republican nominee for U.S. Senator from New Mexico (Class 1); 1928, 1934	Succeeded by Ernest Everly
