= Westbrook, Suffolk County, New York =

Historic district in New York, United States

- Westbrook, Suffolk County, within Bayard-Cutting Arboretum
- U.S. National Register of Historic Places
- U.S. Historic district
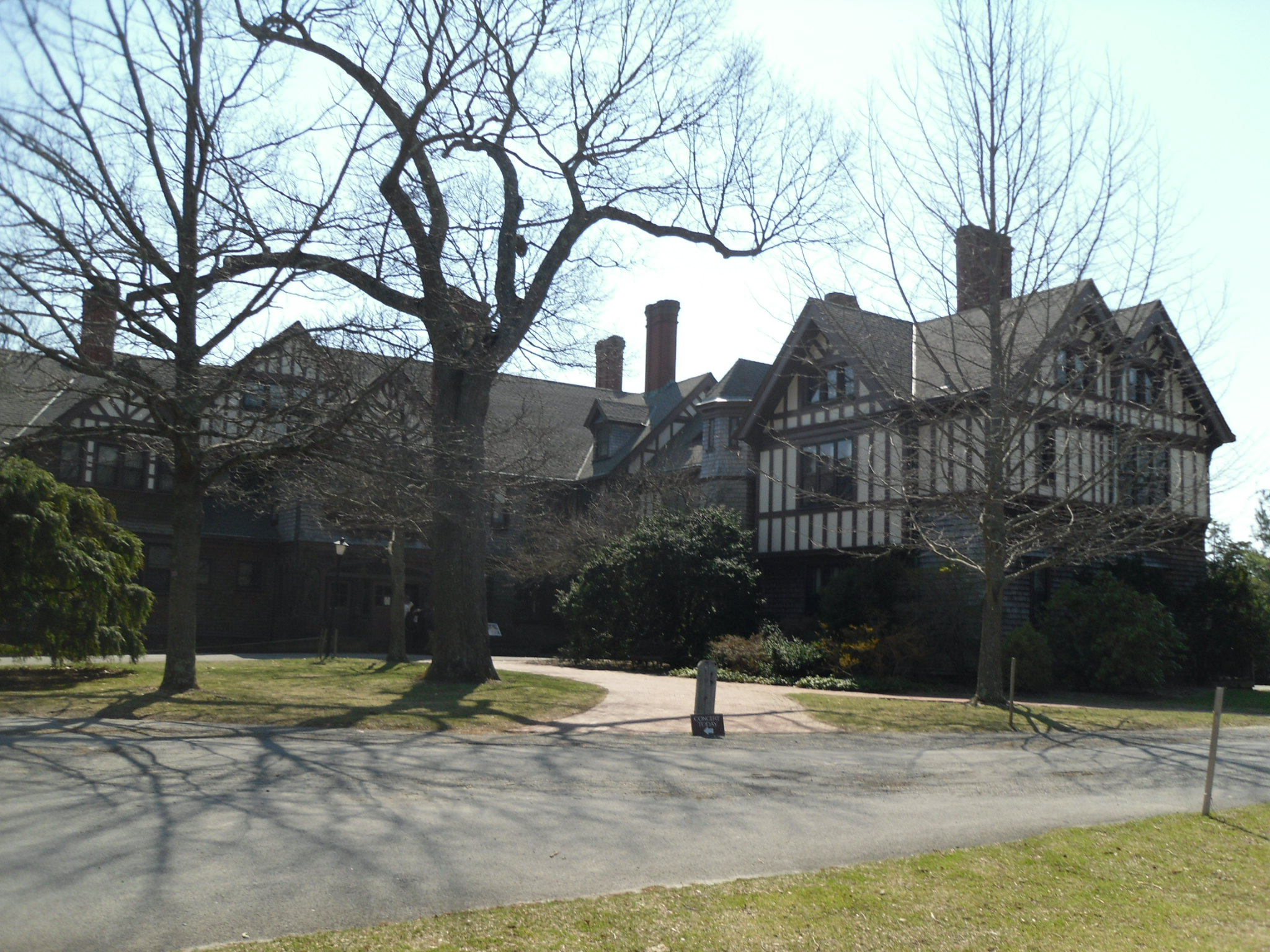
- Westbrook, March 2010

- Location within New York Location within the United States
- Nearest city: Great River, New York
- Coordinates: 40°44′8.430″N 73°09′44.73″W
- Architect: Charles Haight
- Architectural style: Tudor Revival
- NRHP reference No.: 73001271
- Added to NRHP: October 2, 1973

Westbrook, a large rambling house of many gables and tall chimneys on the South Shore of Long Island, lies on the west bank of the Connetquot River.

The estate has been listed on the National Register of Historic Places since 1973 as a national historic district.

== House ==
Westbrook was designed in 1886 for William Bayard Cutting (1850–1912) by the architect Charles C. Haight in the Tudor Revival style. Cutting had bought the estate for building his house on from George L. Lorillard in 1884.

Scottish heather was shipped to provide thatch for the gate house, which remains at the corner of Montauk Highway and Great River Road. In 1895 Cutting and his brother laid out a golf course at Westbrook, known to be the first private golf course in the United States.

The house and its extensive landscaped grounds, now a state park called the Bayard-Cutting Arboretum, are open to the public, having been given to the people of Long Island by Bayard Cutting's widow and daughter "to provide an oasis of beauty and quiet for the pleasure, rest, and refreshment of those who delight in outdoor beauty; and to bring about a greater appreciation and understanding of the value and importance of informal planting."

An early trustee of the Bayard-Cutting Arboretum was Lady Lindsay, born Elizabeth Sherman Hoyt, on Centre Island, Long Island. She was a lifelong friend of the Cuttings and a professionally trained landscape architect who worked for a time for the great American gardener Beatrix Farrand, who had a commission at Westbrook at the beginning of her career. Cutting's daughter, Olivia James, published in 1960, “The Letters of Elizabeth Sherman Lindsay.” Lindsay was married to the British Ambassador to the United States (1930–39), Sir Ronald Lindsay.

== Activities and services ==
At Westbook there is a restaurant, a gift shop, nature trails, and recreational programs.

== Films with scenes shot at Westbrook ==
- 1993: The Age of Innocence, directed by Martin Scorsese and starring Daniel Day-Lewis, Winona Ryder, Michelle Pfeiffer and Joanne Woodward. Based on the 1920 novel by Edith Wharton. (Archery/Lawn Party scene.)

== See also ==
- Bayard Cutting Arboretum State Park
- List of New York state parks
