= Henry James (biographer) =

American lawyer

Henry James III
- Born: May 18, 1879; Boston, Massachusetts, U.S.
- Died: December 13, 1947 (aged 68); New York City, U.S.
- Education: Harvard University; Harvard Law School
- Spouses: Olivia Cutting (m. 1917; div. 1930) Dorothea Draper Bladgen (m. 1938)
- Parent: William James
- Relatives: Henry James Sr. (grandfather); Henry James (uncle); Alice James (aunt)

Henry James III (May 18, 1879 – December 13, 1947) was an American writer who won the Pulitzer Prize for Biography or Autobiography in 1931. James, who was described as "delightful, rather pedantic, crisp, and humorous," was the son of William James and the nephew of novelist Henry James.

== Early life ==
James was born in Boston, Massachusetts on May 18, 1879. He was the son of William James, a philosopher and psychologist, and Alice (née Gibbons) James. He was the grandson of prominent theologian Henry James Sr., the nephew of diarist Alice James, and the novelist Henry James, who referred to him as "Harry" in his letters.

He graduated with an A.B. from Harvard University in 1899 and a Bachelor of Laws from Harvard Law School in 1904. He later received honorary degrees from Hamilton College and Williams College.

== Career ==
He practiced law in Boston from 1906 until 1912, when he became business manager of the Rockefeller Institute for Medical Research, succeeding Jerome D. Greene, and was employed there until 1917. During World War I he was a member of the Rockefeller Foundation's War Relief Commission, served as a private in the 89th Infantry Division, and was commissioned as a lieutenant.

From 1918 to 1919, he was a member of the Versailles Peace Conference which negotiated the peace terms of the end of World War I. He also served as chairman of the Teachers Insurance and Annuity Association from 1928 until his death in 1947, and served 12 years as an overseer of Harvard, where he was a fellow from 1936 until 1947.

=== Writing career ===
James wrote Richard Olney and His Public Service, which was published in 1923, a biography of Richard Olney, the U.S. Secretary of State, and Charles W. Eliot, President of Harvard University, 1869-1901 a biography of Charles W. Eliot published in 1930, which won the 1931 Pulitzer Prize for Biography or Autobiography. James also edited The Letters of William James, which was published in 1921.

== Personal life ==
On June 11, 1917, he married Olivia Cutting, daughter of financier William Bayard Cutting. After their divorce in 1930, he was married to Dorothea Draper Bladgen, the sister of actress Ruth Draper, in 1938 by the Rev. Henry Sloane Coffin. Dorothea was the widow of Linzee Blagden, who died in 1936, and the granddaughter of Charles Anderson Dana, the Assistant Secretary of War under President Lincoln.

James died at his residence, 133 East 64th Street in New York City, on December 13, 1947. His memorial service was held at Grace Church in Manhattan.
