= Walter Livingston =

American politician (1740–1797)

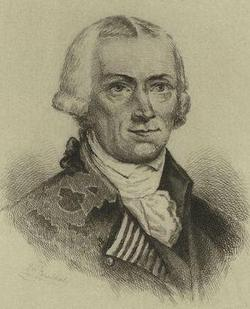

1st Speaker of the New York State Assembly
- In office September 10, 1777 – June 30, 1779
- Preceded by: Position established
- Succeeded by: Evert Bancker

Member of the New York State Assembly from Albany County
- In office July 1, 1784 – June 30, 1785
- Preceded by: various
- Succeeded by: various
- In office September 9, 1777 – June 30, 1779
- Preceded by: Position established
- Succeeded by: various

Personal details
- Born: November 27, 1740 Clermont Manor, Clermont, Columbia County, New York
- Died: May 14, 1797 (aged 56) New York City
- Spouse: Cornelia Schuyler
- Children: Henry Walter Livingston
- Parent(s): Robert Livingston; Maria Thong
- Relatives: Livingston family

Walter Livingston (November 27, 1740 – May 14, 1797) was an American merchant, lawyer and politician.

== Early life ==
He was a son of Robert Livingston (1708–1790), 3rd Lord of Livingston Manor, and Maria Thong Livingston (1711–1765), a granddaughter of Governor Rip Van Dam. His elder brother was Peter R. Livingston. He was a nephew of Philip Livingston (1716–1778) and the grandson of Philip Livingston (1686–1749) and Catharina Van Brugh. He was the great-grandson of Robert Livingston the Elder (1654–1728), a New York colonial official, fur trader, and businessman who was granted a patent to 160,000 acres (650 km^{2}/ 250 sq mi) along the Hudson River, and becoming the first lord of Livingston Manor. His paternal great-grandmother was Alida Schuyler (born 1656), the daughter of Philip Pieterse Schuyler and the widow of Nicholas Van Rensselaer. His great-grandparents were Pieter Van Brugh (1666–1740) and Sara Cuyler.

== Life ==
He was a delegate to the Provincial Convention held in New York in April and May 1775, and a member of the First New York Provincial Congress from May to November 1775. He served as Commissary of Stores and Provisions for the Department of New York from July 17, 1775, until September 7, 1776, when he resigned. He was Deputy Commissary General of the Northern Department in 1775 and 1776.

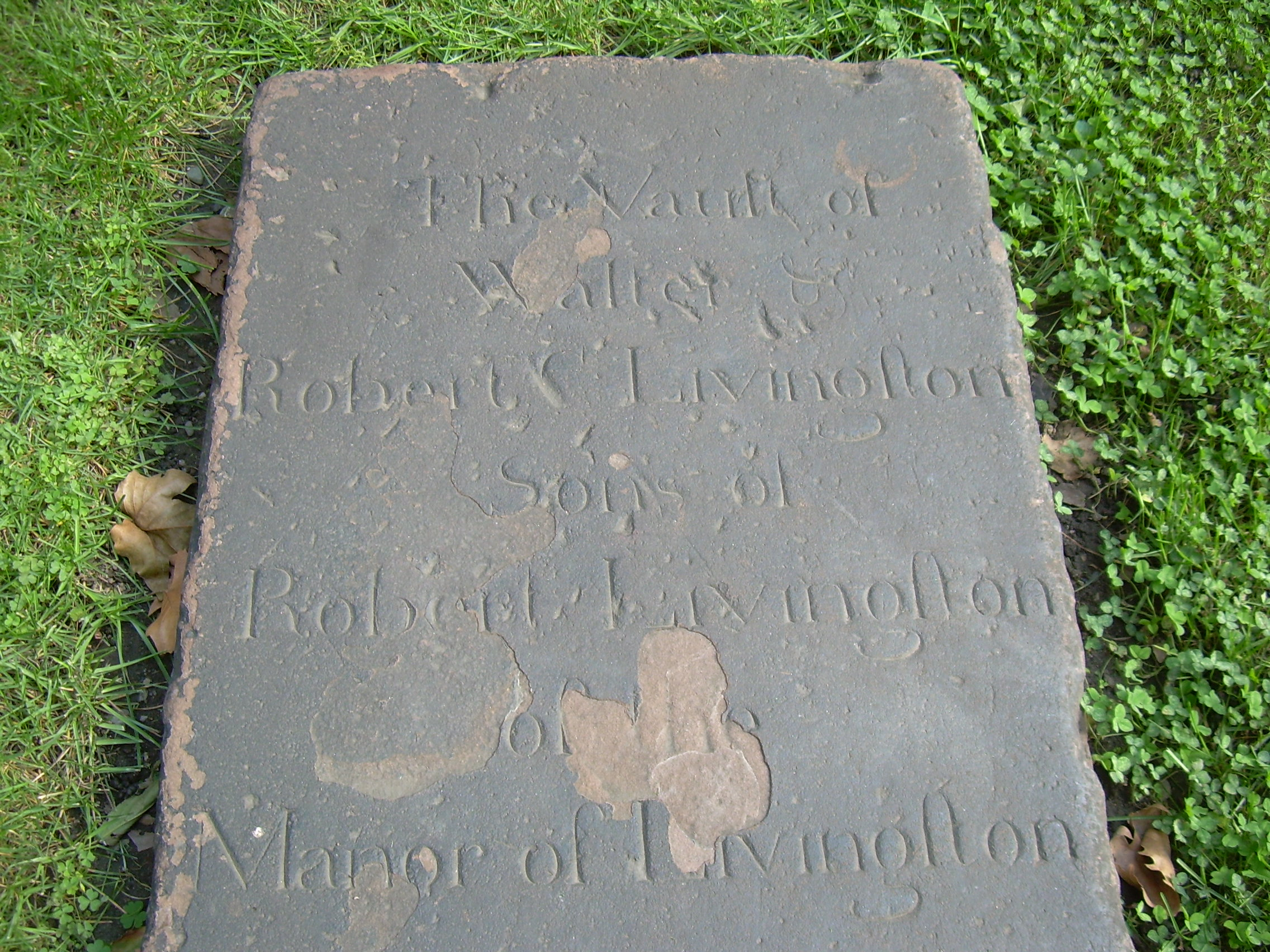
Walter Livingston's grave at Trinity Church Cemetery.

In 1777, he was appointed a county judge for Albany County. He was a member of the first two state assemblies from 1777 to 1779, and the eighth from 1784 to 1785, as one of ten representatives elected on a county-wide general ticket. He was elected by his fellow representatives to be the inaugural Speaker of the Assembly, also from 1777 to 1779. In 1784, he was a member of the New York and Massachusetts Boundary Commission. He was a member of the Board of Regents of the University of the State of New York from 1784 to 1787.

He was a member from New York of the Continental Congress in 1784 and 1785. In 1785, he was appointed Commissioner of the United States Treasury.

=== Residence ===
In 1774, Walter built a Georgian mansion, on a 500-acre estate called Teviotdale in Linlithgo, New York.

== Personal life ==
He married Cornelia Schuyler (1746–1822), daughter of Pieter P. Schuyler (1723–1753) and Gertrude Schuyler (1724–1813), his cousin. Cornelia was the granddaughter of Pieter Schuyler (1657–1724), the first mayor of Albany. Their children include:

- Henry Walter Livingston (1768–1810), a member of the U.S. House of Representatives, who married Mary Allen in 1796.
- Maria Livingston (1770–1828), who married Philip Henry Livingston (1770–1831) in 1788
- Peter Schuyler Livingston (1772–1809), who married Eliza Barclay (1776–1817), the daughter of Thomas Henry Barclay
- Robert L. Livingston (1775–1843), who married Margaret Maria Livingston (1783–1818), the daughter of Chancellor Robert R. Livingston
- Gertrude Livingston (1778–1864), who married William Cutting (1773–1820).
- Harriet Livingston (1783–1826), who married Robert Fulton (1765–1815) in 1808.

He was buried at Trinity Churchyard in New York. His home at Linlithgo in Columbia County, New York, known as Teviotdale, was added to the National Register of Historic Places in 1979.

=== Descendants ===
Robert Linlithgow Livingston Jr. (b. 1943), a Republican U.S. Representative from Louisiana that was the Chairman of the Appropriations Committee from 1995 to 1999, is Walter Livingston's great-great-great-great-grandson.

Through his daughter Gertrude, he was the grandfather of Fulton Cutting (1816–1875), who married Elise Justine Bayard (1823–1852) and were the parents of William Bayard Cutting (1850–1912) and Robert Fulton Cutting (1852–1934).

Political offices
Preceded by none	Speaker of the New York State Assembly; 1777–1779	Succeeded by Evert Bancker
