= Henry W. Livingston =

American politician

Henry Walter Livingston
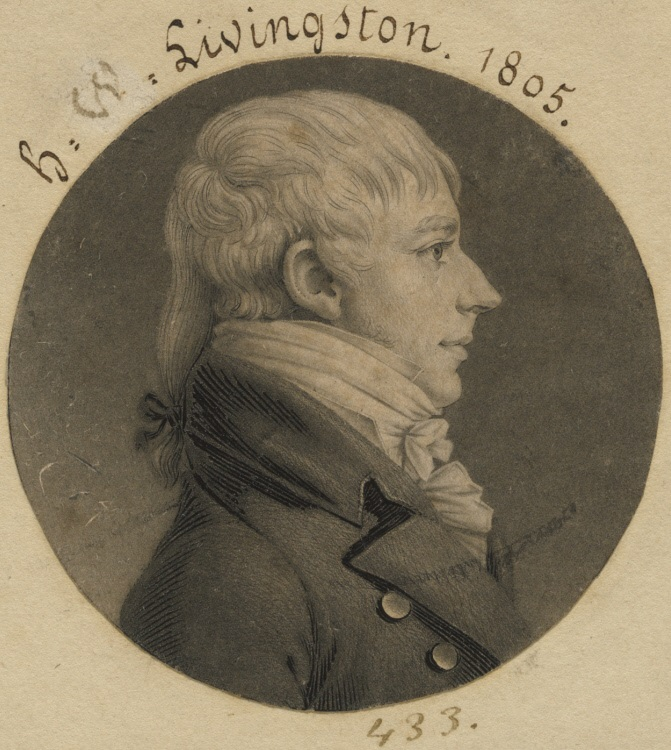

Member of the New York State Assembly for Columbia Co.
- In office July 1, 1809 – June 30, 1810

Member of the U.S. House of Representatives from New York's 8th district
- In office March 4, 1803 – March 3, 1807
- Preceded by: Killian K. Van Rensselaer
- Succeeded by: James I. Van Alen

Member of the New York State Assembly for Columbia Co.
- In office April 1802 – June 30, 1802

Personal details
- Born: June 12, 1768 Livingston, Province of New York, British America
- Died: December 22, 1810 (aged 42) Livingston, New York, U.S.
- Party: Federalist
- Spouse: Mary Masters Allen (m. 1796)
- Children: 7
- Parent(s): Walter Livingston; Cornelia Schuyler
- Relatives: See Livingston family
- Profession: Politician

Henry Walter Livingston (June 12, 1768 – December 22, 1810) was a United States representative from the state of New York.

== Early life ==
Livingston was born in Livingston, New York, to Continental Congressman Walter Livingston and Cornelia Schuyler. He was baptized on June 12, 1768 and had probably been born on the same day. His sister, Gertrude Livingston, who married William Cutting, was the mother of Francis Brockholst Cutting, also a U.S. Representative from New York's 8th congressional district. His youngest sister, Harriet Livingston, was married to Robert Fulton. His paternal grandfather was Robert Livingston, the 3rd Lord of Livingston Manor. His mother was the granddaughter of Pieter Schuyler, the 1st Mayor of Albany.

He graduated from Yale College in 1786, studied law, was admitted to the bar and commenced practice in New York City.

== Career ==
From October 2, 1787 to September 11, 1789, Livingston was a clerk in the office of Alexander Hamilton, who issued a "certificate of clerkship" for him on April 29, 1790, stating that "he is of good moral Character."

From 1792 to 1794 he was private secretary to Gouverneur Morris, who was then Minister to France.

Livingston was then Judge of the Court of Common Pleas of Columbia County. He was a member of the New York State Assembly in 1802 and again in 1810. He was elected as a Federalist to the 8th and 9th Congresses, holding office from March 4, 1803 to March 3, 1807.

== Personal life ==
In 1796, he married Mary Masters Allen (1776–1855), the daughter of James Allen (1742–1778), and granddaughter of William Allen (1704–1780), the Chief Justice of Pennsylvania, and great-granddaughter of Andrew Hamilton (c.1676–1741), a Speaker of the Pennsylvania House of Representatives, members of a prominent Pennsylvania family. They were the parents of:

- Henry Walter Livingston (1798–1848), who married Caroline de Grasse de Pau (1806–1871), daughter of Francis De Pau, a French shipping magnate and slaver, and Silvie de Grasse, daughter of a French count, in 1823
- Walter Livingston (1799–1872), who married Mary Livingston Greenleaf (1802–1886), daughter of James Greenleaf, in 1828
- James Allen Livingston (1801–1825), who died unmarried in Rouen, France
- Mary Livingston (1803–1880), who married James Thomson, Jr. (d. 1847), in 1825
- Elizabeth Livingston (1807–1860), who married William Denning Henderson (1803–1852), in 1828
- Cornelia Livingston (1808–1884), who married Carroll Livingston (1805–1867), son of Henry Brockholst Livingston, in 1828
- Anne Greenleaf Livingston (1809–1887), who married Anson Livingston (1807–1873), another son of Henry Brockholst Livingston, in 1829

He died at his home in Livingston, New York on December 22, 1810. This home in Livingston, known as "The Hill," was added to the National Register of Historic Places in 1971.

Henry W. Livingston and his wife were entombed in a vault at the Henry W. Livingston House. In 1904 the vault was broken into, apparently by grave robbers. The remains were scattered, and efforts to recover them and identify the thieves were unsuccessful.

U.S. House of Representatives
Preceded by Killian K. Van Rensselaer	Member of the U.S. House of Representatives from New York's 8th congressional district 1803–1807	Succeeded by James I. Van Alen
