= William Bayard Jr. =

American banker (1761–1826)

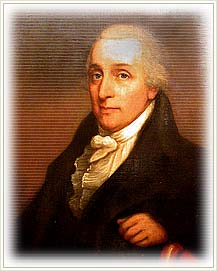
- Portrait of Bayard, c. 1818-1820
- Born: 1761; New York City, Province of New York, British America
- Died: September 18, 1826 (aged 64–65); Westchester County, New York, U.S.
- Resting place: Trinity Church Cemetery
- Spouse: Elizabeth Cornell (m. 1783)
- Children: 7
- Relatives: See Bayard family Stephen Van Rensselaer (son-in-law)

William Bayard Jr. (1761 – September 18, 1826) was a prominent New York City banker and a member of the Society of the New York Hospital. He was a close friend to Alexander Hamilton, who was taken to his Greenwich Village home after his famous duel with Aaron Burr, where Hamilton later died.

== Early life and education ==
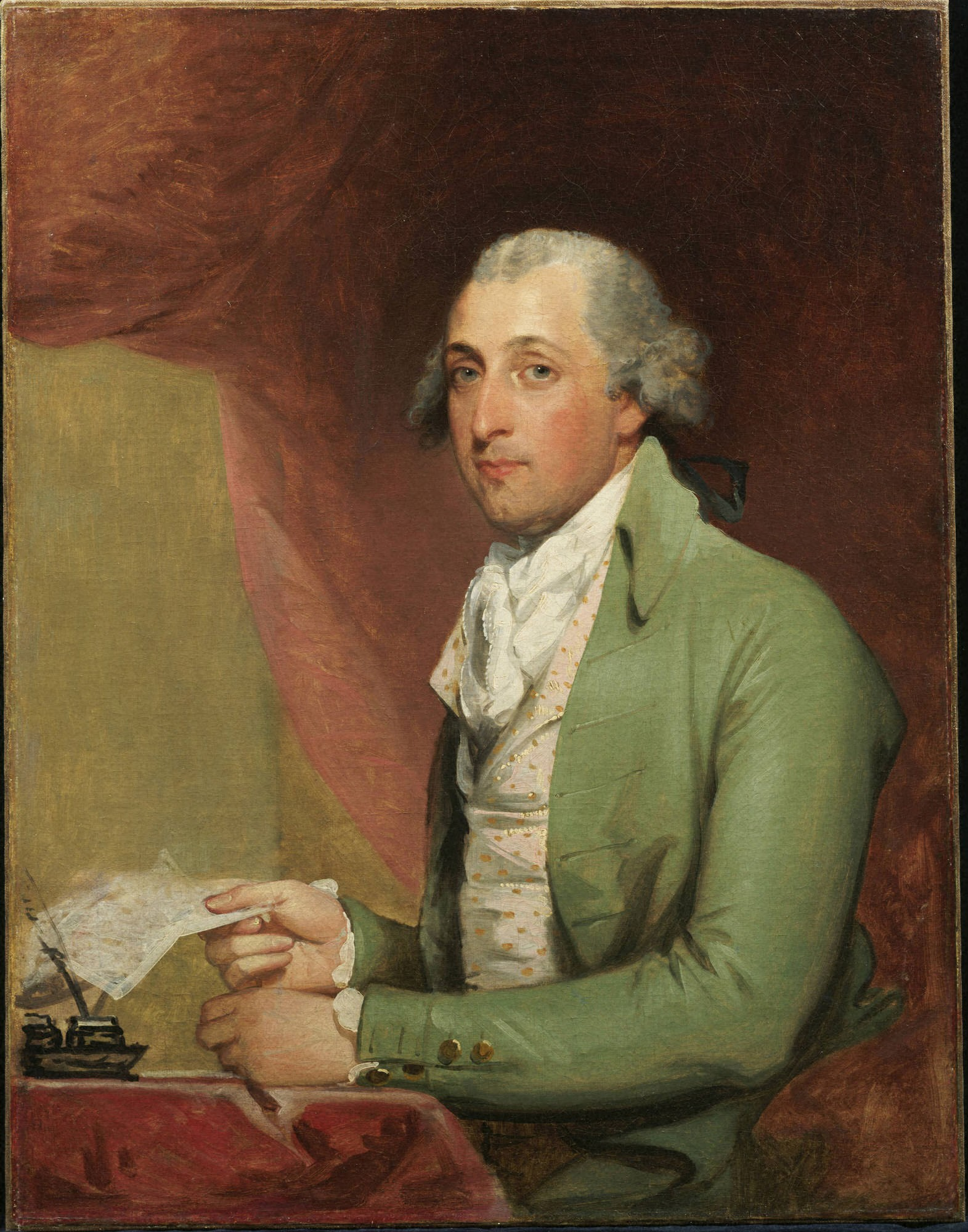
A 1794 portrait of Bayard

Bayard was born in 1761 in present-day New York City in the Province of New York, to Catharine McEvers (1732–1814) and William Bayard Sr. (c. 1727–1804), who served as a delegate to Stamp Act Congress in 1765 and was assigned to the committee that drafted language opposing taxation without representation. When the American Revolutionary War broke out in 1775, his father remained loyal to The Crown, assisting British troops that occupied New York City in 1776. Bayard Jr. remained in New York City after the Revolutionary War, but other members of the family fled the city, and many of the family's properties were confiscated. His siblings included Samuel Vetch Bayard (1757–1832) and Mary Bayard (1779–1849).

=== Family ===
Bayard was a member of the prominent Bayard family of French Huguenot ancestry who descended from Balthazar Bayard, a French Protestant, who took refuge in the Dutch Republic, where the Huguenots found sanctuary from their religious persecution in France. The first Bayards in the New World arrived in the Dutch colony of New Amsterdam, then governed by Governor-General Peter Stuyvesant. In the early 18th century, the Bayards were among the largest landowners in the New York-New Jersey region at the time. Bayard was also a descendant of Stephanus Van Cortlandt and the Schuyler family.

== Career ==
Bayard founded the mercantile firm of LeRoy, Bayard & McEvers with Herman LeRoy and James McEvers. The firm was dissolved in 1816 after McEvers retired and was reorganized as Leroy, Bayard & Co. Bayard was director of the First Bank of the United States, president of The Bank for Savings in the City of New-York from its founding in 1819, governor of the New York Hospital, trustee of the Sailors' Snug Harbor, member of the New York Society Library, and one of the owners of the Tontine Coffee House.

He was chairman of a meeting in December 1815 that drafted the petition for the Erie Canal and chairman of the celebration planning for the canal's completion in 1825. From 1801 until 1821, Bayard served as a vestryman at Trinity Church. In 1824, he was chairman of the committee to receive General Lafayette in 1824.

=== Alexander Hamilton ===
Bayard was a close friend of Alexander Hamilton, a Founding Father who was appointed the first U.S. Secretary of the Treasury by George Washington during his presidency.

On July 11, 1804, when Hamilton was critically injured in his famous duel with Aaron Burr in Weehawken, New Jersey, Hamilton was transported across the Hudson River to Bayard's Greenwich Village home for medical attention. Hamilton died in Bayard's home the following day.

== Personal life ==
Coat of Arms of William Bayard Jr.

In 1783, Bayard married Elizabeth Cornell (d. 1854), daughter of Loyalist Samuel Cornell and Susannah Mabson, and a descendant of Thomas Cornell (c. 1595 – c. 1655). Elizabeth's father died in 1781 in British-controlled New York, having moved there from North Carolina after 1777 after refusing to take the Oath of Allegiance to the new United States. Samuel Cornell had transferred a share of his North Carolina property to Elizabeth; in 1779, however, the North Carolina Legislature voted to retroactively seize all property of Loyalists back to 1776. In November 1784, Mrs. Bayard unsuccessfully sued to have her property returned to her.

William Jr. and Elizabeth had seven children, including:

- Catherine Bayard (1786–1814), who married Duncan Pearsall Campbell (1781–1861), grandson of Duncan Campbell (d. 1758)
- Susan Bayard (1787–1814), who married Benjamin Woolsey Rogers (1775–1859), son of Moses Rogers, a wealthy New York merchant who owned Shippan Point, and Sarah Woolsey, and a distant cousin descended from Thomas Cornell
- William Bayard (1788–1875), who married Catherine Hammond
- Maria Bayard (1789–1875), who also married Duncan Pearsall Campbell (1781–1861)
- Eliza Justine Bayard (b. 1793), who married Joseph Blackwell
- Robert Bayard (1797–1878), who married Elizabeth McEvers
- Harriet Elizabeth Bayard (1799–1875), who married General Stephen Van Rensselaer IV (1789–1868), son of Stephen Van Rensselaer, both a distant cousin through the Van Cortlandt family.

== Death ==
Bayard died on September 18, 1826, in Westchester, New York. Along with his wife, Elizabeth, he was buried in the Churchyard Cemetery of Trinity Church in Lower Manhattan in present-day New York City.

=== Descendants ===
Bayard's granddaughter, Eliza Bayard Rogers (1811–1835), through his daughter Susan Bayard Rogers, married William Paterson Van Rensselaer (1805–1872), son of Stephen Van Rensselaer III, on May 13, 1833, in New York City. William P. Van Rensselaer was a half-brother to Stephen Van Rensselaer IV, the husband of Bayard's youngest daughter, Harriet E. Bayard. William and Eliza had one son together, William P. Van Rensselaer Jr. (1834–1854), before Eliza's death in 1835. On April 4, 1839, Van Rensselaer remarried to Eliza's sister, Sarah Rogers, with whom he had the rest of his children.
