= Pennsylvania School of Horticulture for Women =

Horticultural college associated with Temple University

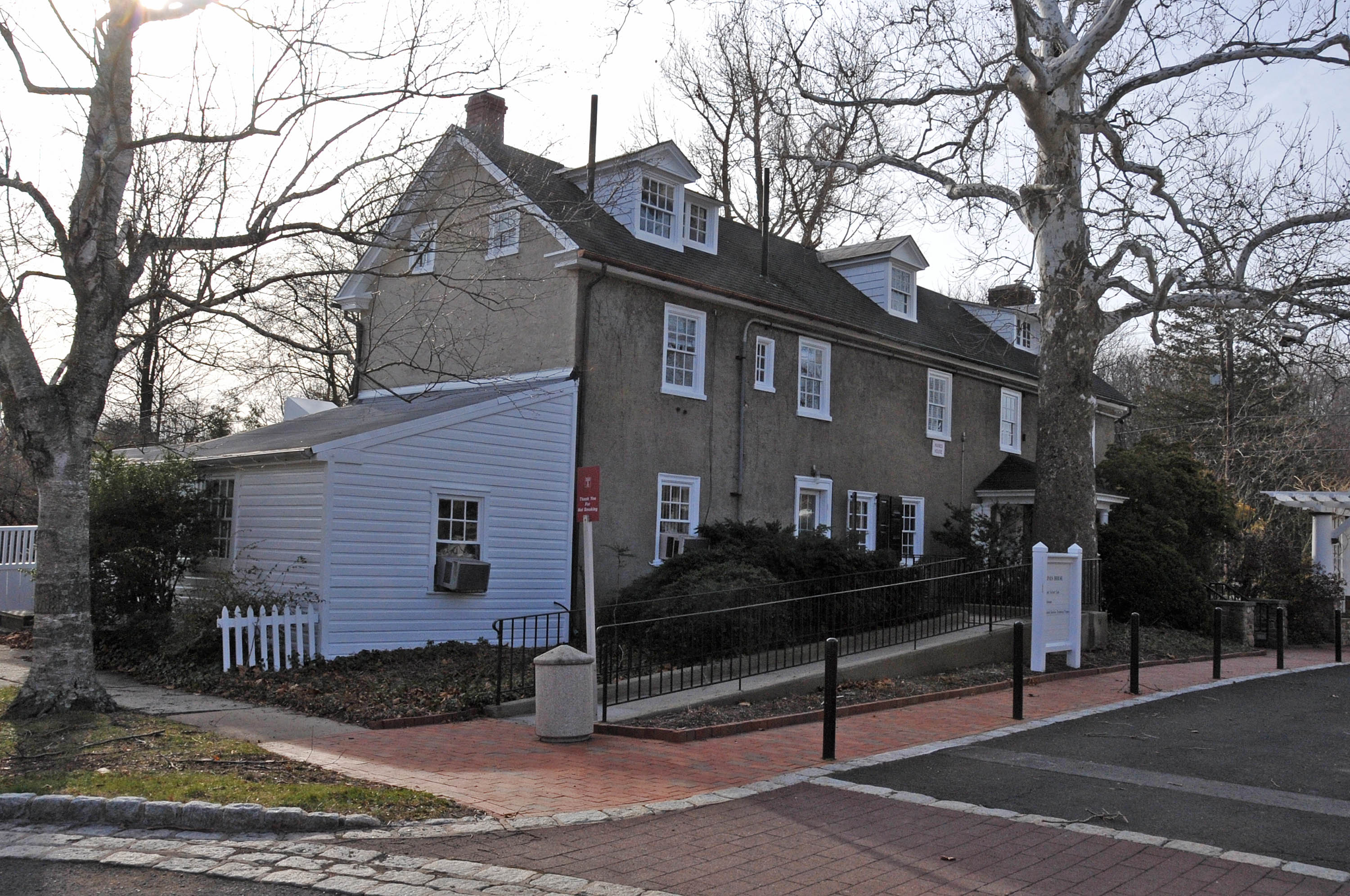
- Established: 1910; In 1958 merged with Temple University Ambler
- Location: 580 Meetinghouse Road, Ambler, PA 19002, Ambler, Pennsylvania, United States; 40.1645°N 75.1925°W
- Campus: Suburban

The Pennsylvania School of Horticulture for Women was one of the first horticultural schools to be established by and for women in the United States, opening February 10, 1911. As the second institution to provide women with a practical education in horticulture and landscape architecture, it made possible their entry into a professional field. Although some men were employed in faculty positions, the school's leadership was intentionally female. As of 1919, the board of trustees consisted of twenty-five prominent women citizens. All but the last director of the school were women.

The school played a "unique role" in women's history and garden history. Members of the school were instrumental in the establishment of the Garden Club of America (1913), the Woman's National Agricultural and Horticultural Association (1914), the Woman's Land Army of America (1917), and the publication of the Farmer's Digest. It served as a national and international model for other institutions, such as the Keisien School in Japan.

In 1958, the school merged with Temple University Ambler and became co-educational.

== Foundation of the school ==
=== Jane Bowne Haines ===
The school was founded by Jane Bowne Haines (1869-1937). Haines was born into a well-off Philadelphia Quaker family with an established tradition of horticultural practice, which enabled her to educate herself about horticulture. She studied formally at Bryn Mawr College and the New York State Library School at Albany. Working in the fruit and shade-tree nursery on her family's estate in Cheltenham, Pennsylvania, she became determined to found a school of practical horticulture for women in the Philadelphia area. It was a pioneering effort, preceded in the United States only by the Lowthorpe School in Groton, Massachusetts.

While travelling in Europe, Haines visited women's schools in England and Germany. She was particularly inspired by two horticultural colleges in England, the Studley School near Reading, and the Swanley Horticultural College near London.

In 1910 Haines purchased the 71-acre McAlonan farm near Ambler, Pennsylvania, as the site of the proposed school. A colonial farmhouse on the acreage was renovated to provide offices, staff space, a classroom, and a dining hall.

The school was formally chartered by the Commonwealth of Pennsylvania as of 1910. A board of trustees was formed, of which Haines became president. Other board members included Mira Lloyd Dock, who wrote the school's constitution, Elizabeth Leighton Lee, Emma Blakiston, and Ann Dorrance. A principal, Mary D. Collins, and a full-time instructor, Miss E.D. Varley, were hired.

"One principle above all others we will keep before us and would particularly enforce — the trained hand with the trained mind, which means mastery and success." Haines, 1910

The first class was held on February 11, 1911, welcoming five students. The "classroom" was so small that the teacher had to stand in the doorway to lecture. The second year class in 1914 had four students, with 10 new students entering. At the end of the first two years, three students completed the program. They had to wait until 1915 for official commencement ceremonies.

By 1915, a second building was built, with a proper classroom on the first floor, and dormitory space on the second floor. The women students lived on campus, either rooming in the small college dormitory, or boarding in houses nearby.

Louise Carter, a student in the second graduating class, of 1915, and later the fourth director of the Pennsylvania School, describes its perceived importance:

"We were venturing into completely new territory for women, and we had no way of knowing what opportunities the future might hold for us. But we had enthusiasm for the work and faith and zeal. And we realized that we were blazing a new trail; if we were successful in the positions we held, it would create new opportunities for the students of the future."

=== Elizabeth Leighton Lee ===
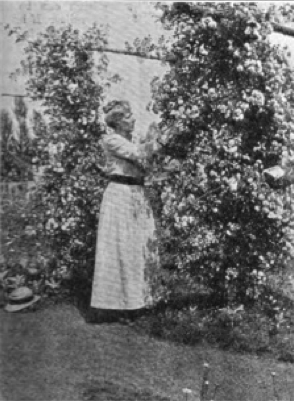
Elizabeth Leighton Lee in the garden of the School, 1917

Elizabeth Leighton Lee became director of the Pennsylvania School of Horticulture for Women in 1915, and led the school during World War I (See more below). Lee is considered the first woman practitioner of landscape architecture in the Philadelphia area, and is credited with beginning the landscape design program at the school. In 1925, the school also hired Markley Stevenson as a faculty member. Stevenson had studied landscape architecture at Harvard. By 1934, under the direction of faculty member James Bush-Brown, the school offered a 2-year "Preparatory course for Professional Study in Landscape Architecture". The program's design component included nine hours per week of freehand drawing, drafting, and the history of gardens in the first year, and nine hours per week of freehand drawing, landscape construction, and planning design in the second year. Graduating students were eligible for advanced admission to the Cambridge School of Domestic and Landscape Architecture (later Smith College).

=== Louise Carter Bush-Brown ===
Under Louise Carter Bush-Brown's direction, from 1924-1952, the campus continued to expand. A new dormitory was built in 1929, holding 50 students. New greenhouses were added in the 1930s. In the 1940s, the Blakiston property, 116 acres, was purchased and added to the school. In 1951, Bush-Banks donated her personal collection of 16th Century herbals to the school, as a cornerstone of the new Hilda Justice Memorial Library. Bush-Brown also arranged collaborative programs with the Cambridge School of Architecture and Landscape Architecture (later Smith College Graduate School) for the granting of degrees.

Louise Bush-Brown published several books on gardening, including the best-selling America’s Garden Book (1939), a collaboration with husband and faculty member James Bush-Brown. Under her leadership, the school also published the Farmer's Digest, enabling faculty and students of the school to reach out to a broader public.

== Curriculum ==
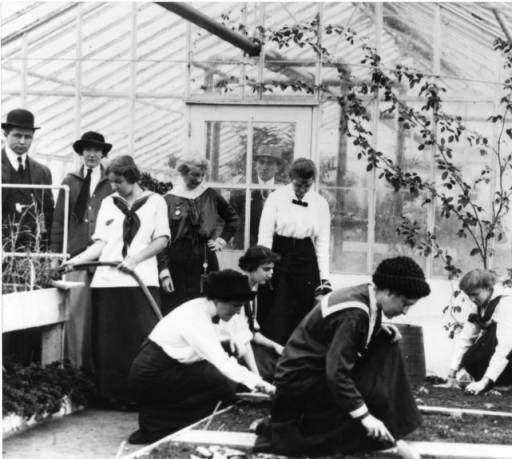
Students at work in a greenhouse at the Pennsylvania School of Horticulture for Women

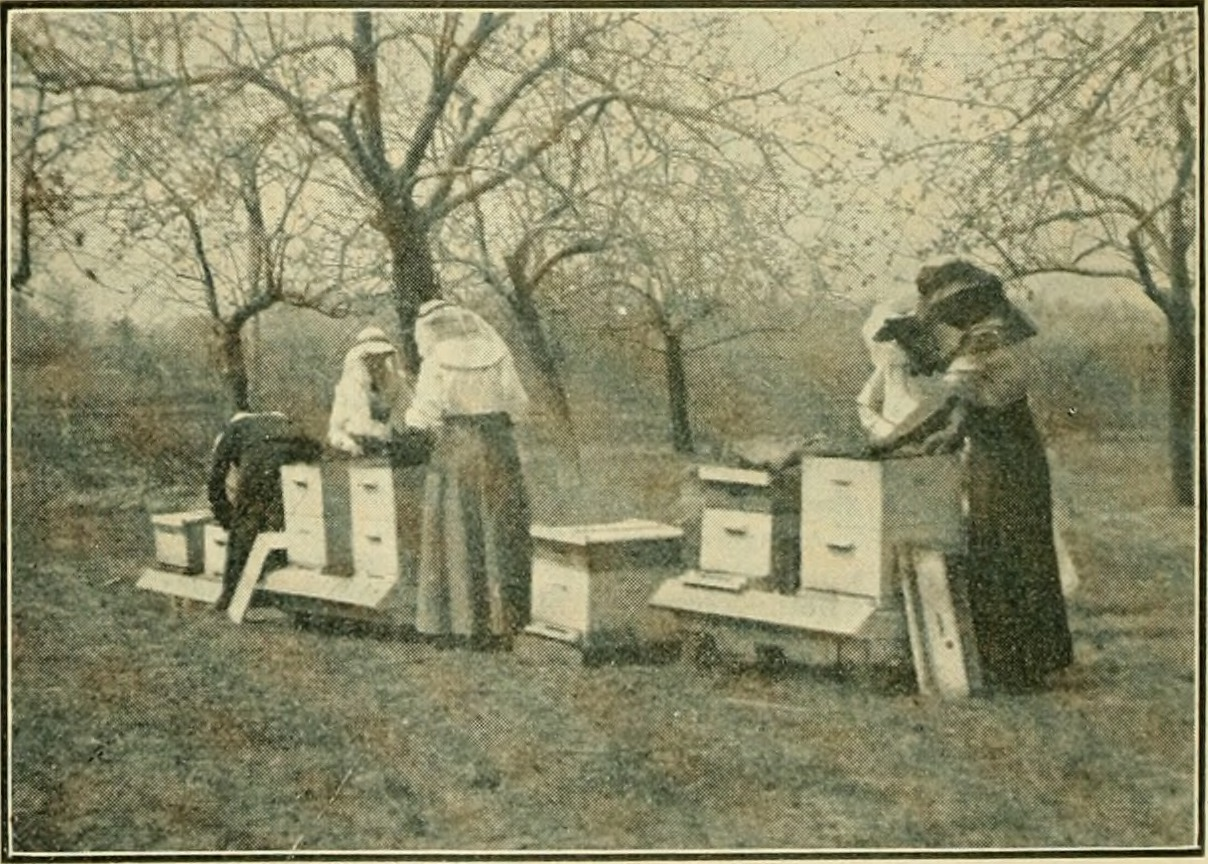
Women students of beekeeping at the Pennsylvania School of Horticulture for Women

The school was intended to offer women real professional opportunities, in areas including horticulture, garden design, estate management, farming, and education. To ensure that women would have the skills needed for a career in horticulture or agriculture, the school provided both theoretical and practical training. Students were expected to "learn-by-doing", spending two hours working in the school's gardens and orchard for every hour of study spent in the classroom.

Courses offered at the school eventually included book-keeping, botany, business management, farm management, floriculture, garden design, horticulture, landscape architecture, orchard care, and soil chemistry. Students were trained to grow and use flowers, fruits, ornamental plants, shrubs, and vegetables. The program of study also included optional courses on bee keeping, canning, raising poultry and dairy animals, and practical carpentry.

== Gardens ==
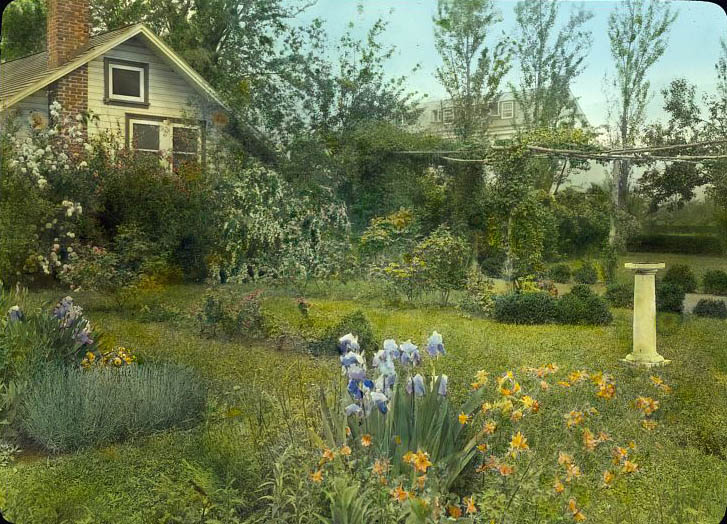
Kitchen garden, Pennsylvania School of Horticulture for Women, 1919

The grounds were used by students and faculty to develop trial gardens of various styles. In 1916, eight students under the supervision of Elizabeth Leighton Lee created the Colonial Revival garden as the first project in landscape architecture at the school. A naturalistic Woodland Garden of flowering trees, shrubs, and spring bulbs dates to the 1920s. A Formal Perennial Garden was designed in 1931 by James Bush-Brown and Beatrix Farrand. This tradition continues today with gardens such as the Ernesta Ballard Healing Garden and the Albright Winter Garden on the Ambler campus.

== Impact ==
The Pennsylvania School of Horticulture for Women held progressive ideas, programs and associations.

=== The Garden Club of America ===
A number of those concerned in the founding of the Philadelphia School of Horticulture for Women were also members of the Garden Club of Philadelphia. The Garden Club of Philadelphia was established in 1904 by Mrs. J. Willis Martin and Miss Ernestine Goodman, with the first official meeting being at Andalusia, the home of Mrs. Charles Biddle. The first president of the Garden Club of Philadelphia was Ellen Stuart Patterson (Mrs. C. Stuart Patterson) in 1908.

The members of the Garden Club of Philadelphia reached out to other organizations to form the Garden Club of America (GCA) in 1913. Women such as Louisa Boyd Yeomans King (Mrs. Francis King), who had formed the Gardeners Club of Michigan in 1912, were important in this work.

=== Woman's National Farm & Garden Association ===
In May 1914, the first official meeting of the Woman's National Agricultural and Horticultural Association, later known as the Woman's National Farm & Garden Association (WNF&GA) was held at the Pennsylvania School of Horticulture for Women. Its organizers included Jane Bowne Haines, Louisa Boyd Yeomans King, Elizabeth Leighton Lee, Elizabeth Price Martin and Hilda Loines. Once again, the organizers were inspired by international efforts, in this case the British Women's Farm and Garden Union, which had been established in 1899. The association's mission was to "promote agricultural and horticultural interests among women, and to further such interests throughout the country." The first annual conference of the Woman's National Agricultural and Horticultural Association included a number of speakers, including King, of Alma, Mich., the president of the association; Miss Martha Van Rensselaer, director of home economics at Cornell University; and Mrs. J. Willis Martin of Philadelphia, president of the Garden Club of America, among others.

=== The Woman's Land Army of America ===
During World War I, the Pennsylvania School of Horticulture for Women was significantly involved in starting the Woman's Land Army of America, which mobilized nearly 20,000 women to work in America's agricultural sector. The Saturday Evening Post commended Elizabeth Leighton Lee and the school, stating that "the graduates of Miss Lee's school have a wonderful chance to serve their country, for they are the material that should make the officers in our volunteer agricultural army". Women in the program were known locally as the "Ambler Farmerettes". Among other activities, the school held "War Courses" for Captains and Lieutenants of Land Army Units. In 1918, fourteen students represented the school in a defense parade in Philadelphia, carrying signs such as "Hens Against Huns" and "Don't Let it Rot - You'll Need it".

== Merger ==
In 1952, the school received provisional accreditation as a junior college. In 1957, under its fifth director, Jonathon French, the Pennsylvania School of Horticulture for Women changed its name to Ambler Junior College, and was given the right to grant Associate of Science degrees. In 1958, the school partnered with Temple University, later Temple University Ambler. In doing so, it became co-educational. Temple Ambler dates its beginning to the first classes held at the Pennsylvania School of Horticulture for Women in 1911.

== Historic recognition ==
Designations

Pennsylvania Historical Marker
- Official name: Pennsylvania School of Horticulture for Women, The
- Designated: September 20, 2002

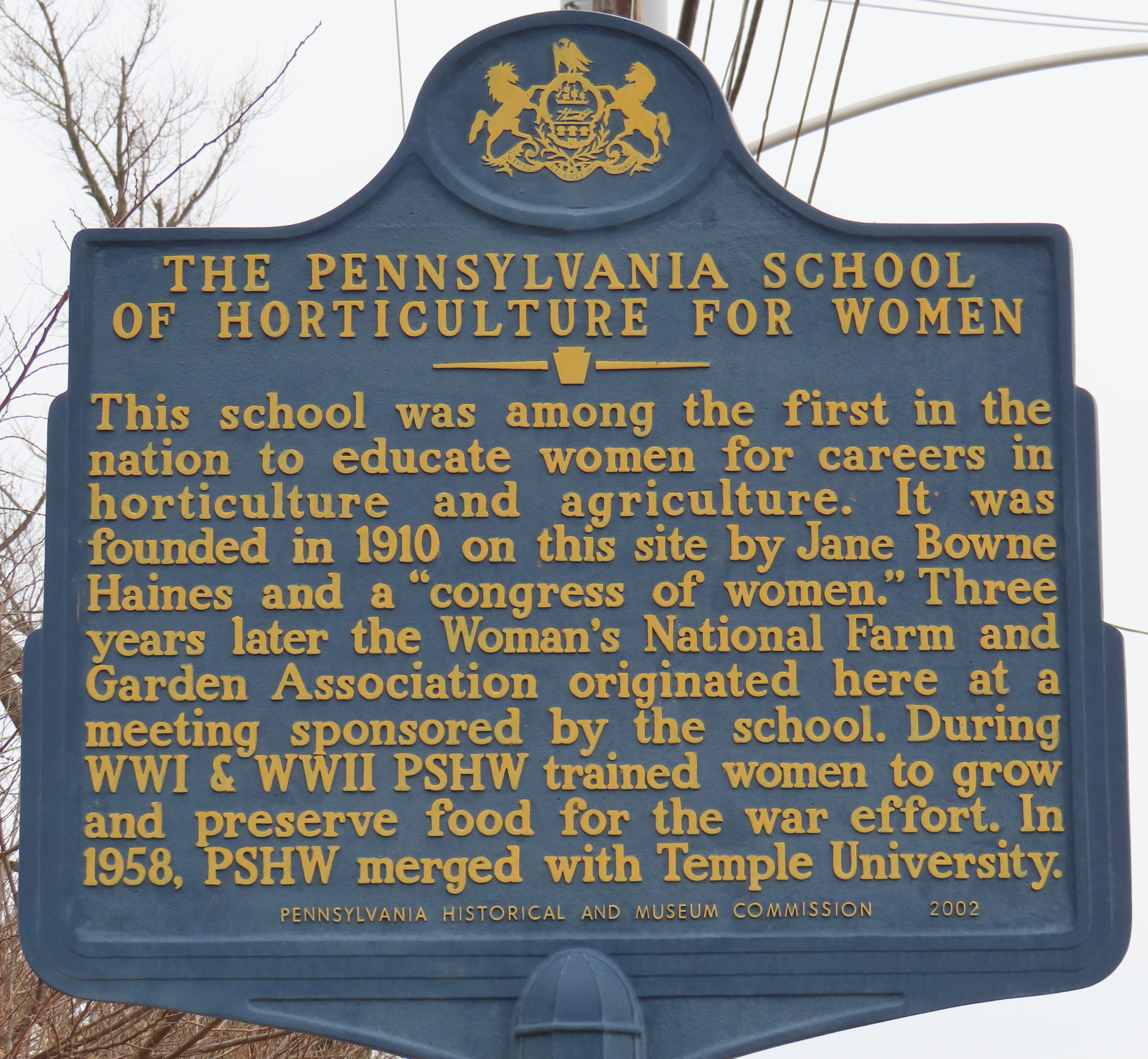
Historical marker, "The Pennsylvania School of Horticulture for Women," Temple University Ambler, Pennsylvania.

The School was recognized by the placement of a historic marker at 580 Meetinghouse Road, Ambler, Pennsylvania, on September 20, 2002. Known as the Haines House, the original school building is the oldest building on the Temple Ambler campus, dating to 1760.

"This school was among the first in the nation to educate women for careers in horticulture and agriculture. It was founded in 1910 on this site by Jane Bowne Haines and a "congress of women." Three years later the Women's National Farm and Garden Association originated here at a meeting sponsored by the school. During WWI and WWII PSHW trained women to grow and preserve food for the war effort. In 1958, PSHW merged with Temple University."

To celebrate the 100th anniversary of the founding of the school, Temple University Ambler published a commemorative book: A Century of Cultivation 1911-2011: 100 Years from the Pennsylvania School of Horticulture for Women to Temple University Ambler.

== Faculty, staff and students ==
Significant people associated with the school include the following:

=== Directors ===
- Jane Bowne Haines, President of the board of directors until her death in 1937
- Jessie T. Morgan, director as of 1914
- Elizabeth Leighton Lee, director from 1915-1924
- Louise Carter Bush-Brown (1897-1973), director from 1924-1952
- Jonathon French, director from 1953-1963

=== Faculty ===
- Ruth Patrick (1907-2013), botany teacher, 1939-1947

William R Hale Sr was a Teacher and care taker of School of Horticulture for Women from 1954 to 1975 son also William R Hale Jr worked also as Maint. Man.

=== Students ===
- Louise Carter (later Bush-Brown)
- Ernesta Drinker Ballard
- Gertrude "Tommy" Tompkins Silver

== See also ==
- Mira Lloyd Dock and the Progressive Era Conservation Movement
