= The Hermitage (Linlithgo, New York) =

Coordinates: 42.1318°N 73.8366°W

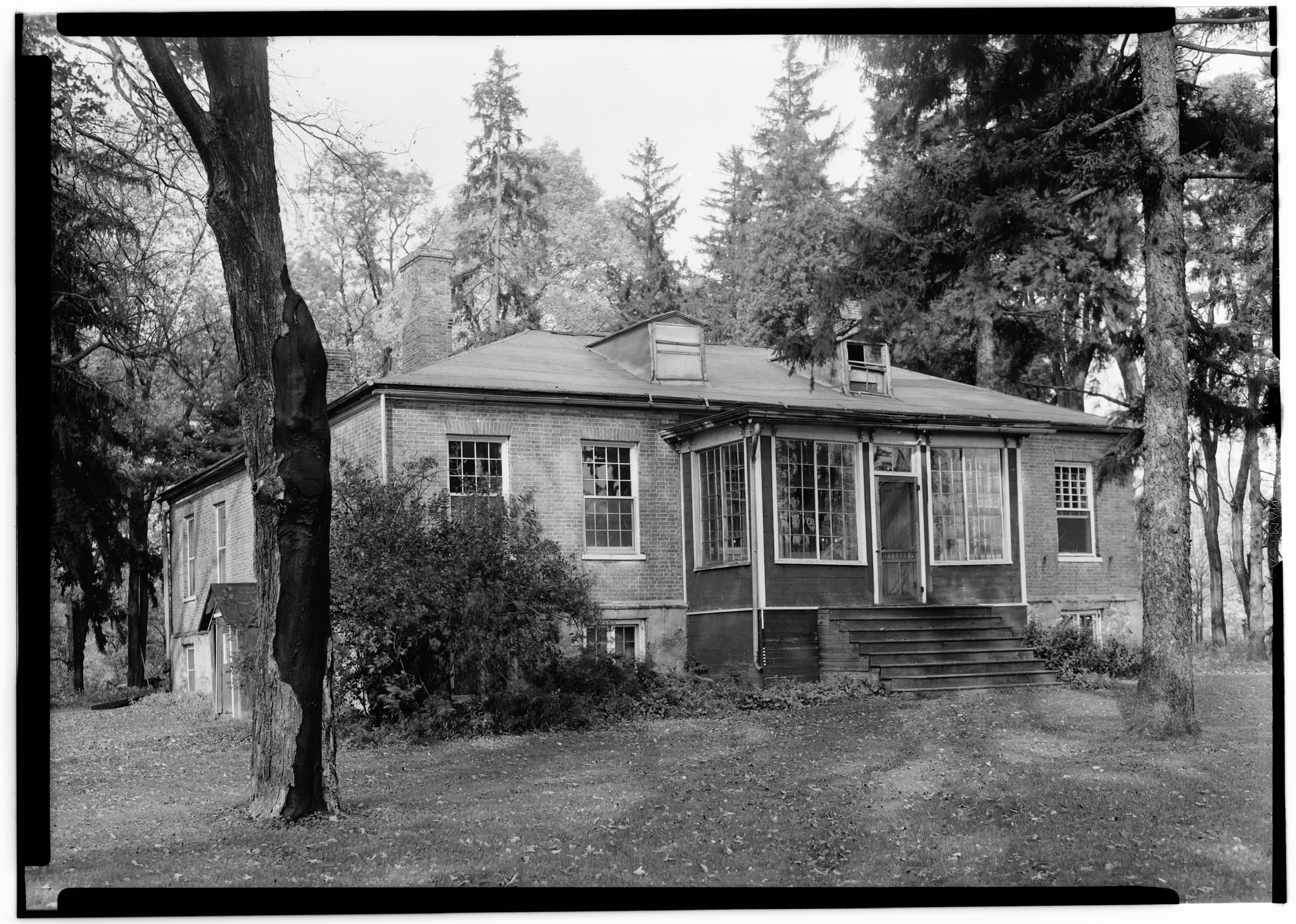
View-Front Elevation, Jan. 16, 1937

The Hermitage was a historic home located at Linlithgo in Columbia County, New York. It was built about 1774 by Robert Livingston for his eldest surviving son, Peter Robert Livingston. It wasn't completed until 1939 by then owner Ida Helen Ogilvie. After her death in 1963, the house remained vacant until 1982 when it was purchased by Margaret Rockefeller and torn down the following year.

== History ==
Peter was the eldest surviving son of Robert Livingston, third and final Lord of Livingston Manor. Upon his death in November 1790, aged eighty-one, Robert broke with the family tradition of leaving the estate to his eldest son and shared Livingston Manor among his five sons. While the eldest, Peter Robert Livingston (1737–1793), inherited "Clermont" proper, Robert devised his land lying east of the Post Road to four of his sons, Walter (who built the adjoining Teviotdale), Robert C., Henry, and John, each receiving about 28,000 acres; the several lots being located from north to south, along the post-road, in the order named. Each received also a part of the domain to the west of that road. Originally the land was covered with timber, principally pine and oak.

When the Hermitage was first constructed, it consisted of "a high basement floor half above the ground, and one floor above that."

"With the expectation of becoming, in the course of nature, the fourth lord of Livingston Manor, Peter R. Livingston began to build for himself a handsome house 3-1/2 miles south of the Manor House. That was just before the War of the Revolution began or during its early stages. The walls of the new house (built of brick on a large ground area) had reached the height of the first story and a great stairway had been placed in the main hall when hostilities halted construction. A makeshift roof was placed over the walls and the owner retired in deep gloom to this peculiar dwelling, to which the name "The Hermitage" was given."

After Livingston's death in 1794, his eldest son, Robert Thong Livingston (1759–1813), sold the estate to his cousin, U.S. Representative Henry W. Livingston, to settle his father's debts. While he may have intended to finish the house, Henry did not and, instead, built a far grander home, known as The Hill (in 1803). Henry sold The Hermitage to his younger brother, Peter Schuyler Livingston (1772–1809), who was listed as the owner when it was publicly advertised for sale in 1799. It was then sold to another brother, Robert L. Livingston (1775–1843), who married Margaret Maria Livingston (the younger daughter and co-heiress of Chancellor Robert R. Livingston). After they married, Robert and Margaret moved into Arryl House (also known as New Clermont). In 1804, Robert L. Livingston sold it to John Richmond (1746–1829) who lived here with his wife, Mary, until his death during which time he turned the property into a successful farm, known as the "Hermitage Farm". The Richmonds had four sons (none of whom married) and one daughter, Mary Richmond (who married John Taylor, the Mayor of Albany). Richmond's eldest son, Timothy, died in 1863 and in 1866 his executors sold the 658-acre estate to Alexander Fisher for $35,000.

During Fisher's ownership, he maintained extensive orchards but abandoned the earlier woolen mills. After his death, his son Frank failed to maintain the mortgage and the bank foreclosed on the property. The property was bought at auction for $19,000 in 1899 by the heirs of the late James B. Jermain of Albany, who included among them Catherine B. J. McClure. "On the partition of the Jermain estate in 1906, the Hermitage was conveyed to Catherine though she never lived there, presumably leasing it to various tenants. In 1928, she sold it to Albert M. Reed, of Manchester, Vermont."

=== Ogilvie years ===
In 1930, The Hermitage was purchased by Ida Helen Ogilvie, founder and former head of Barnard College's Geology department. During World War II, she was involved with the Woman's Land Army of America to work in agriculture replacing men called up to the military. In this capacity, she transformed the farm at the Hermitage into a productive dairy farm, stocking it with Jersey cattle from Airlie Farm in Westchester, her partner Delia West Marble's farm. Along with her architect, Harold R. Sleeper, she finished the house in 1939 by adding "a wing and lifted the roof, adding another story and a half and a portico – a covered porch supported by columns".

=== Demolition ===
Ogilvie died in 1963 and the house remained unused until 1982 when it was purchased, along with two other farms totaling 1,137 acres including the Hermitage, by Margaret Rockefeller, wife of David Rockefeller, for $1.5 million. Claiming it was in too poor shape to restore, she had the home torn down in 1983.

"When we first bought it, we felt we would keep the house, but we found it was in terrible shape", Mrs. Rockefeller said. "We tried to sell it, but nobody wanted to buy it. We tried to give it away, but no one would accept it. It was in terrible shape and very expensive to repair and it was useless for us."

According to writer/director James Ivory (who owned the Jacob Rutsen Van Rensselaer House and Mill Complex in Claverack, New York), he said: "It makes you heartsick. It was the only building on the property that people cared about."

== Gallery ==
=== Historic American Buildings Survey, 1937 ===
As part of the Historic American Buildings Survey, The Hermitage was photographed by Nelson E. Baldwin on January 16, 1937.

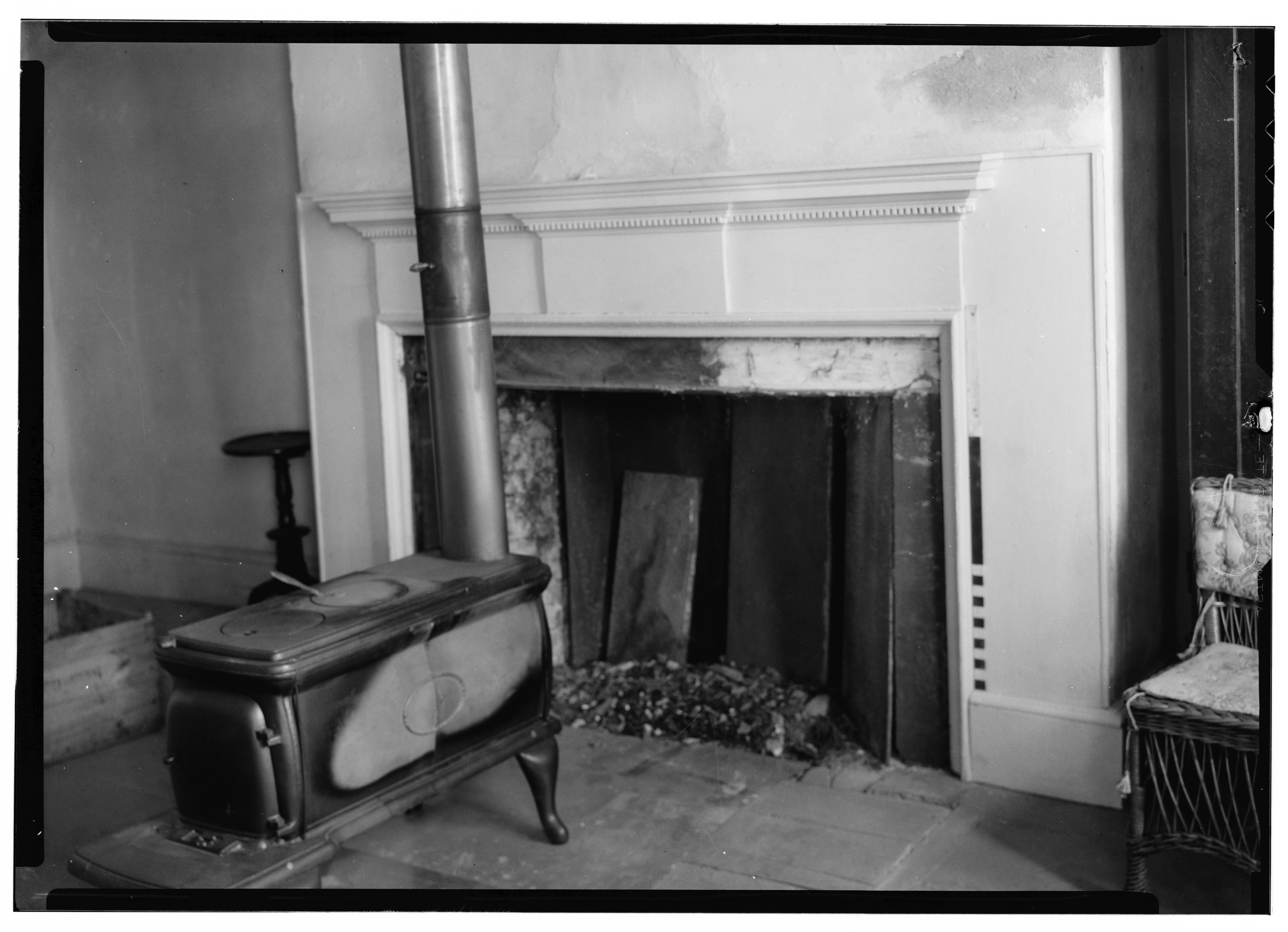
Fireplace in Living Room

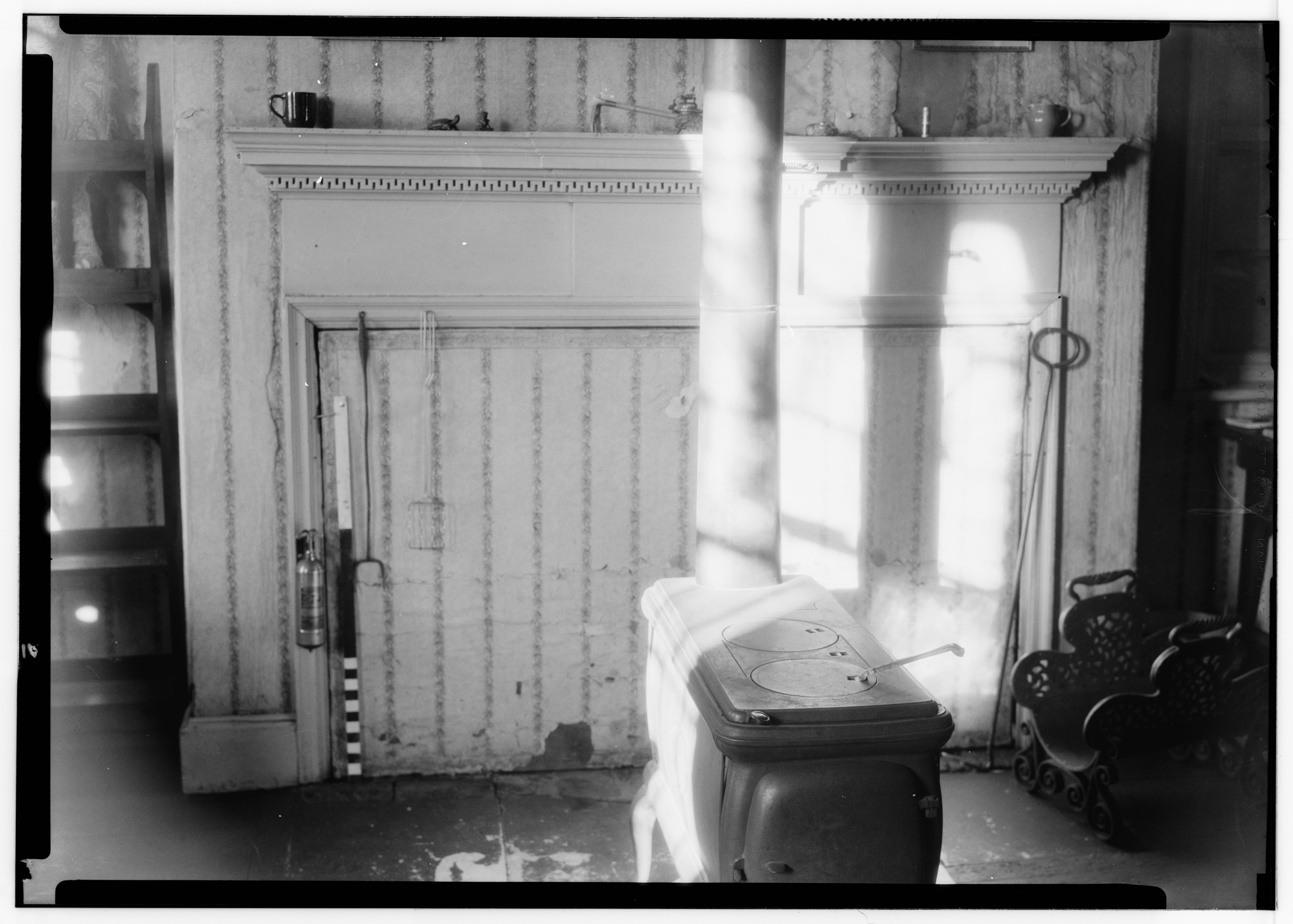
Fireplace in Living Room

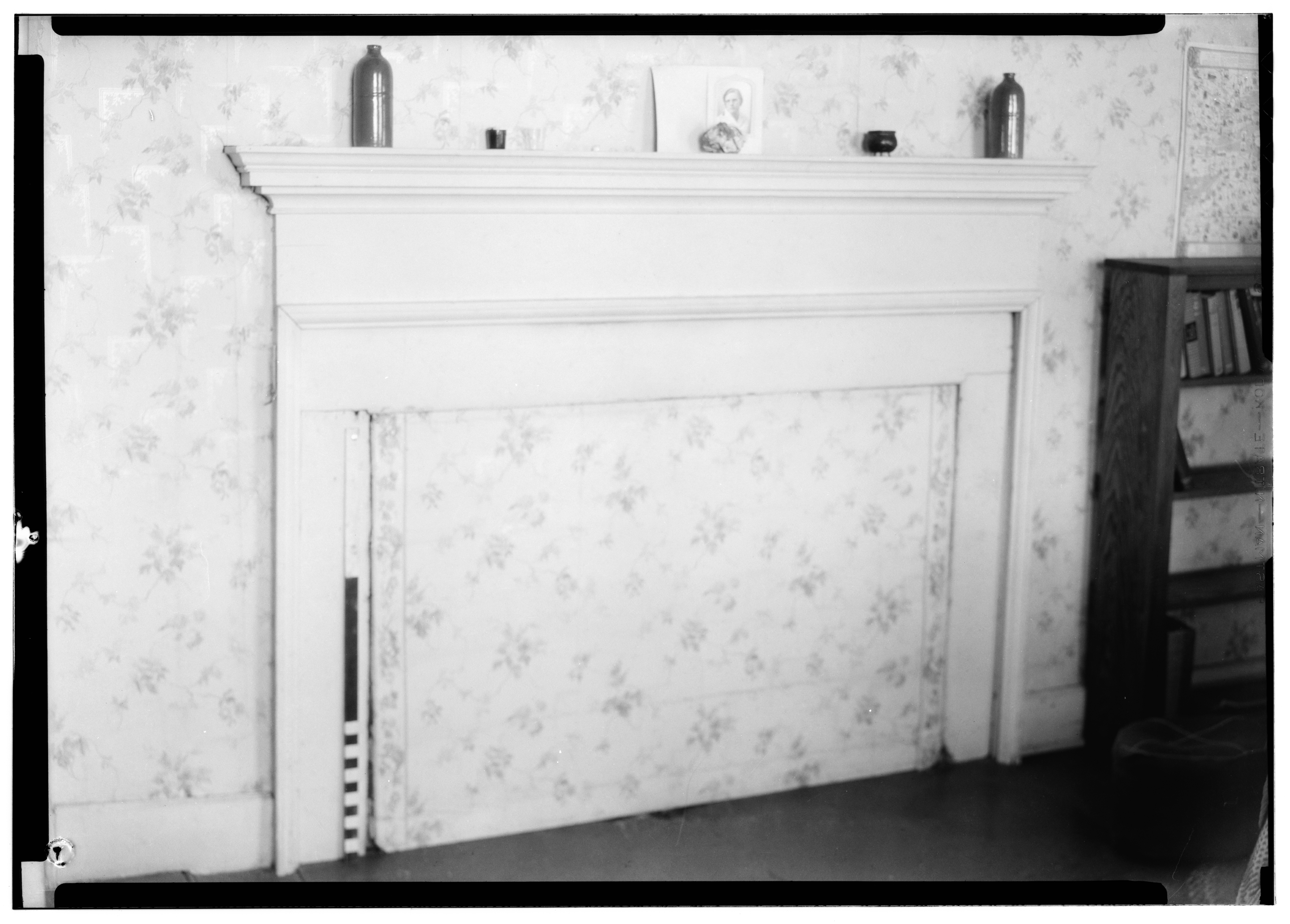
Fireplace in Library

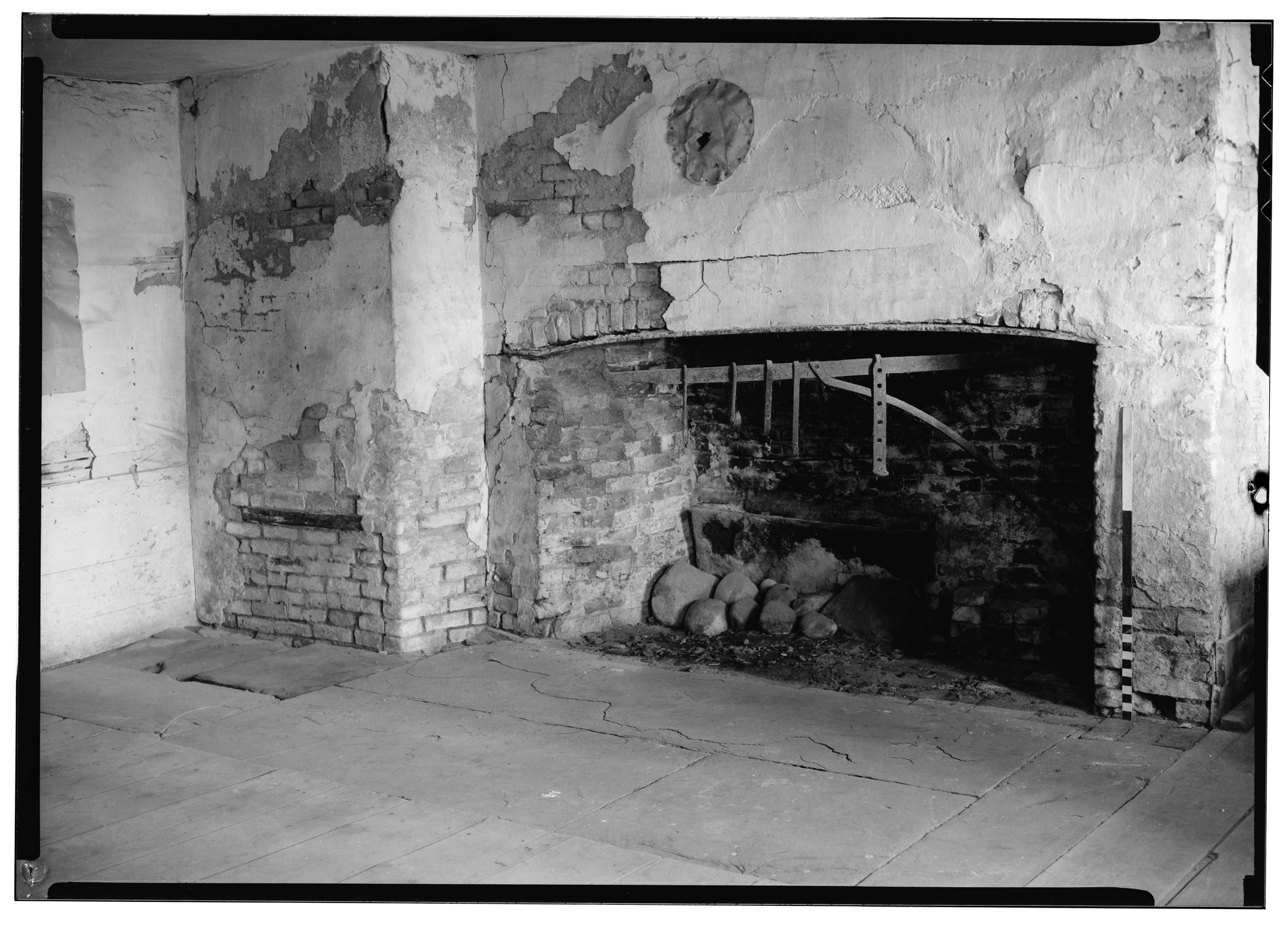
Dutch Oven, Basement

=== Architectural drawings ===
Basement floor plan

First floor plan

Attic and roof plan

East elevation

South elevation

West elevation

North elevation

Transverse section

Mantel drawings
