= Peter R. Livingston (politician, born 1737) =

American landowner, soldier and politician

Colonel Peter Robert Livingston

Member of the New York General Assembly
- In office 1774–1775
- Preceded by: Philip Livingston
- Succeeded by: Abolished
- In office 1761–1769
- Preceded by: William Livingston
- Succeeded by: Philip Livingston

Personal details
- Born: April 27, 1737 Clermont Manor, Clermont, Columbia County, New York
- Died: November 13, 1794 (aged 57)
- Spouse: Margaret Livingston (m. 1758)
- Children: 11
- Parent(s): Robert Livingston; Maria Thong
- Relatives: See Livingston family

Col. Peter Robert Livingston (April 27, 1737 – November 13, 1794) was an American landowner, soldier and politician.

== Early life ==
Livingston was born on April 27, 1737, at Clermont Manor, Clermont, Columbia County, New York and grew up at Linlithgo, his great-grandfather's manor house. He was the eldest surviving son of Maria (née Tong) Livingston and Robert Livingston, 3rd Lord of Livingston Manor. Among his siblings were Walter Livingston, the first Speaker of the New York State Assembly. After the death of his mother in 1765, his father married Gertrude (née Van Rensselaer) Schuyler, daughter of Kiliaen Van Rensselaer.

His paternal grandparents were Catharina (née Van Brugh) Livingston and Philip Livingston, 2nd Lord of Livingston Manor. He was the great-grandson of Robert Livingston the Elder, a New York colonial official, fur trader, and businessman who was granted a patent to 160,000 acres (650 km^{2}/ 250 sq mi) along the Hudson River, and becoming the first lord of Livingston Manor. His mother was a granddaughter of Governor Rip Van Dam.

His father expected Peter and his brothers to take their place as his business agents and had them educated accordingly.

== Career ==
In 1761, he was elected to the New York General Assembly, representing the Manor of Livingston. He withdrew from the Assembly in 1768 to make way for his uncle, Philip, but was returned in 1774 and was the last to hold office under manorial rights.

He was chairman of the Committee of Safety. In 1775 he was a member of the 1st Provincial Convention and served as its president in 1776.

In 1775, he was appointed Colonel of Militia for the 10th Albany Regiment, known as the "Manor of Livingston" Regiment; and was at the American Revolutionary War battles at White Plains and Stillwater. He resigned as Colonel in 1780.

In 1793, he was a member of the Provincial Convention. That year, he ran for Congress in New York's 6th congressional district as a Federalist, and lost to fellow Federalist candidate Ezekiel Gilbert by 29 votes.

== Personal life ==
On June 6, 1758, Livingston was married to his cousin, Margaret Livingston (1738–1809), in New York City. Margaret was a daughter of Maria (née Kierstede) Livingston and Jacobus "James" Livingston (a son of Robert Livingston the Younger). Together, they were the parents of eleven children, including:

- Robert Thong Livingston (1759–1813), (Note: Robert Thong Livingston (1759–1813) inherited The Hermitage in 1794 but sold it shortly thereafter to Henry Walter Livingston (his first cousin), to settle his father's debts. In 1800, Robert torn down "Linlithgo" the original manor house at the mouth of Roeliff Jansen Kill built by his ancestor, Robert Livingston the Elder, 1st Lord of the Manor of Livingston.) who married Margaret Livingston, daughter of John Livingston and Catherine (née de Peyster) Livingston, in 1787.
- Mary Livingston (1761–1775), who died young.
- James Smith Livingston (1764–1765), who died young.
- Peter William Livingston (1767–1826), who married Elizabeth Beekman, daughter of Gerard William Beekman and Mary (née Duyckinck) Beekman, in 1793.
- Margaret Livingston (1768–1802), who married John De Peyster Douw, son of Mayor Volkert P. Douw, in 1795.
- James Smith Livingston (1769–1837), who married Mary Price.
- Moncrieffe Livingston (1770–1853), who married Frances Covert, daughter of Elisha Covert, in 1790. After her death in 1814, he married Catherine Thorn in 1824.
- Walter Tryon Livingston (1772–1827), who married Eliza Platner. After her death, he married Elizabeth McKinstry in 1798.
- John Lafitte Livingston (1773–1776), who died young.
- William Smith Livingston (1779–1795), who died young.
- Mary Thong Livingston (1783–1841), who married Alexander Wilson in 1805. After his death three months later, she married George Crawford in 1808.

He died on November 13, 1794, at his home in Livingston. His widow died on July 31, 1809.

=== The Hermitage ===
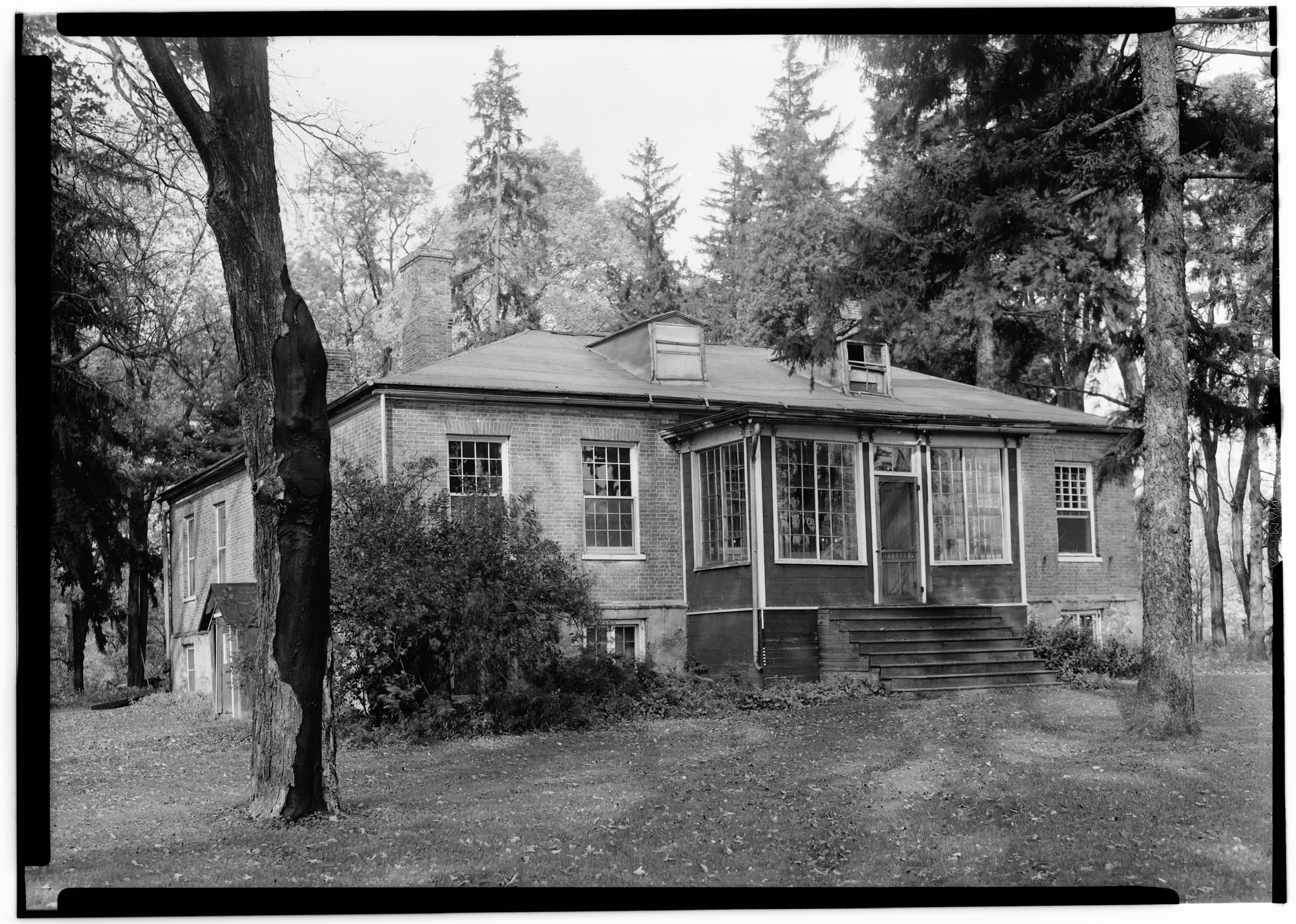
The Hermitage Linlithgo, New York, 1937

Beginning in 1774, Livingston's father built a residence for Peter and his family on 600-acres, known as The Hermitage, in Linlithgo, a hamlet in Livingston, New York. His brother's house, Teviotdale, adjoined The Hermitage to the south. Although he was the eldest son and principal heir of his father, Peter ran up considerable debts during his father's lifetime, and as part of the action taken to curtail his inheritance, his father built him The Hermitage, although the house was put in the name of Peter's eldest son, Robert. Peter's father hoped his son would add a second story but he never did. The house was sold among Livingston family members for many years but wasn't completed until 1939 when "a wing and lifted the roof, adding another story and a half and a portico - a covered porch supported by columns" were added by Ida Helen Ogilvie, founder and former head of Barnard College's Geology department, and her architect, Harold R. Sleeper. Ogilvie died in 1963 and the house remained unused until 1982 when it was purchased by Margaret Rockefeller, wife of David Rockefeller, for $1.5 million. Claiming it was in too poor shape to restore, she had the home torn down in 1983.

== Sources ==
Notes
