= Temple University Ambler =

Public university in Upper Dublin Township, Pennsylvania, US

Coordinates: 40.166°N 75.191°W

- Type: Public
- Established: 1910 (as Pennsylvania School of Horticulture for Women); 1958 (as part of Temple University)
- Dean: James Hilty
- Faculty: 325
- Administrative staff: >100
- Students: 3867
- Undergraduates: 3053
- Postgraduates: 810
- Doctoral students: 4
- Location: 580 Meetinghouse Road, Ambler, Pennsylvania, U.S.
- Campus: Suburban
- Colors: Cherry and White
- Nickname: Temple Ambler
- Mascot: Owls
- Website: ambler.temple.edu

Temple University Ambler is a suburban campus of Temple University. The Ambler campus is located 30 minutes outside Philadelphia, Pennsylvania in Montgomery County, Pennsylvania. While its postal address is in Ambler, Pennsylvania, it is actually in Upper Dublin Township.

It has 2,950 undergraduate and 962 graduate students, with a 3:4 male/female ratio (60% female). The campus is 187 acres (0.76 km^{2}), including the Landscape Arboretum, and includes two residence halls. On campus, there are 30 student organizations. The campus offers 21 bachelor's degree programs—8 majors and 13 minors—as well as one associate degree program.

== Bachelor's degree programs ==
The following 8 bachelor's degrees are offered at the Ambler campus:

- Accounting
- Business Management
- Horticulture
- Human Resource Management
- Landscape Architecture
- Liberal Arts-Interdisciplinary Studies
- Marketing
- Psychology

Students can begin more than 100 bachelor's degree programs and take courses at any of Temple's campuses, including affiliated international campuses. A free shuttle bus is available seven days a week to and from the main campus.

Ambler College is one of the 14 schools and colleges at Temple University. Based at the Ambler campus, the School features three environmental programs: community and regional planning, horticulture, and landscape architecture. The campus was founded in 1910 as the Pennsylvania School of Horticulture for Women. The School has a focus on environmental sustainability and ecological restoration. The Ambler campus is also the home of the Center for Sustainable Communities.

== Campus organizations ==
There are 30 Ambler student organizations, including the student newspaper, The Temple Column, the Ambler Food Committee, and the student radio station, WRFT 1610-AM.

The Ambler campus is also home to the Temple University Infant Lab, directed by Professors Kathy Hirsh-Pasek and Nora Newcombe. The lab researches the development of memory, language, and spatial cognition, as well as how play supports the development of the latter two abilities.
