= Woman's National Farm & Garden Association =

- Abbreviation: WNF&GA
- Formation: 1914
- Founder: Louisa Boyd Yeomans King
- Type: Non-profit organization
- Region served: East North Central States, Northeastern United States
- President: Mary Bertolini
- Main organ: Farm & Garden
- Website: www.wnfga.org

The Woman's National Farm & Garden Association (WNF&GA) is an American non-profit organization dedicated to promoting agriculture and horticulture. Membership is open to men and women; chapters are active in the Northeastern United States and the East North Central States.

== History ==
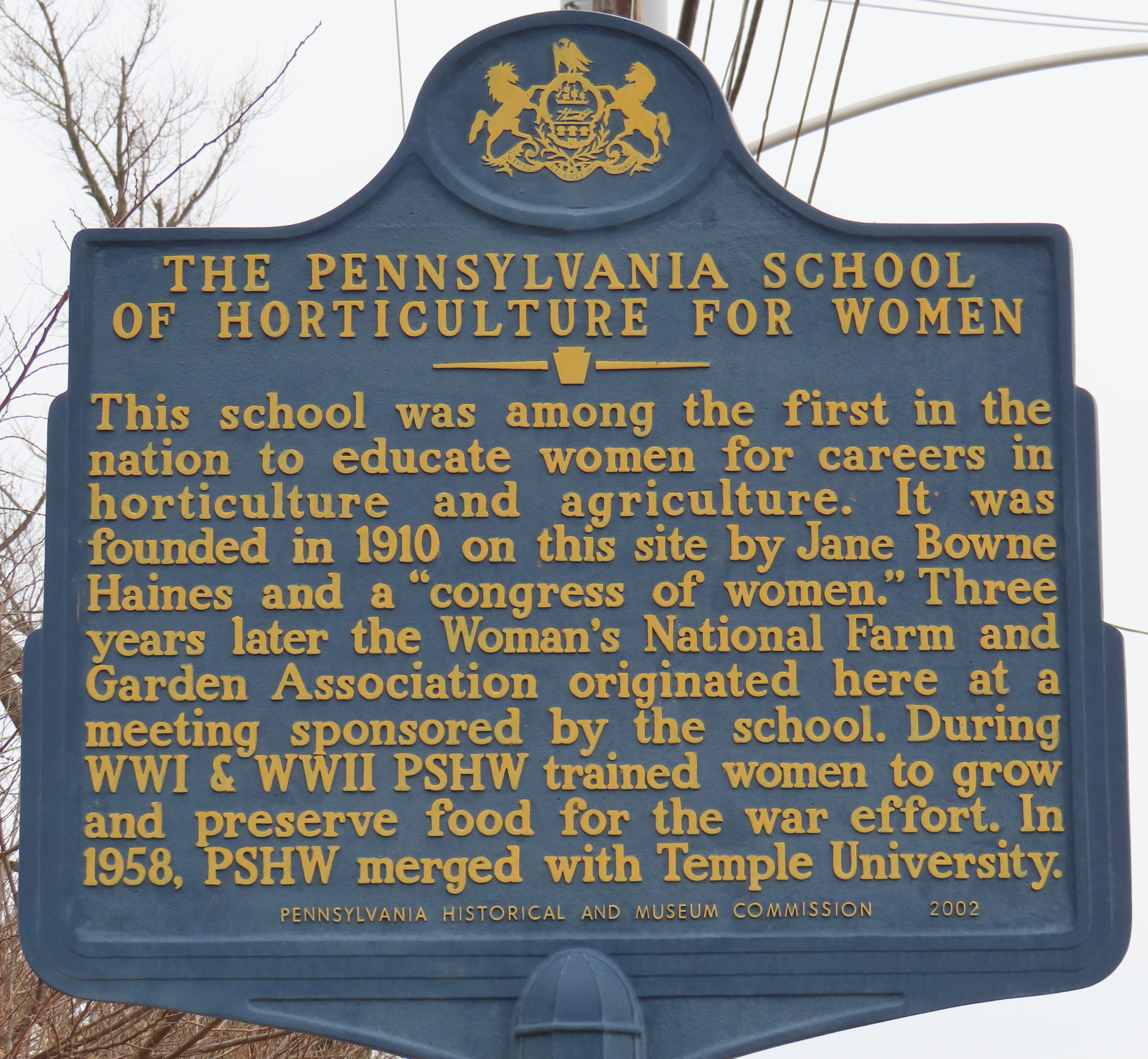
Historical marker at Temple University Ambler, Pennsylvania, marks the site of the founding of WNF&GA.

The WNF&GA was founded in 1914, as the Women's National Agricultural and Horticultural Association, "to promote agricultural and horticultural interests among women, and to further such interests throughout the country." In 1916, the name was changed to Woman's National Farm & Garden Association, using the singular form to reflect the importance of the individual, as well as to accommodate the name of a similar organization in England. The founders included Jane Bowne Haines, Louisa Boyd Yeomans King, Elizabeth Price Martin, Elizabeth Leighton Lee, and Hilda Loines. King served as its first president from 1914 to 1921.

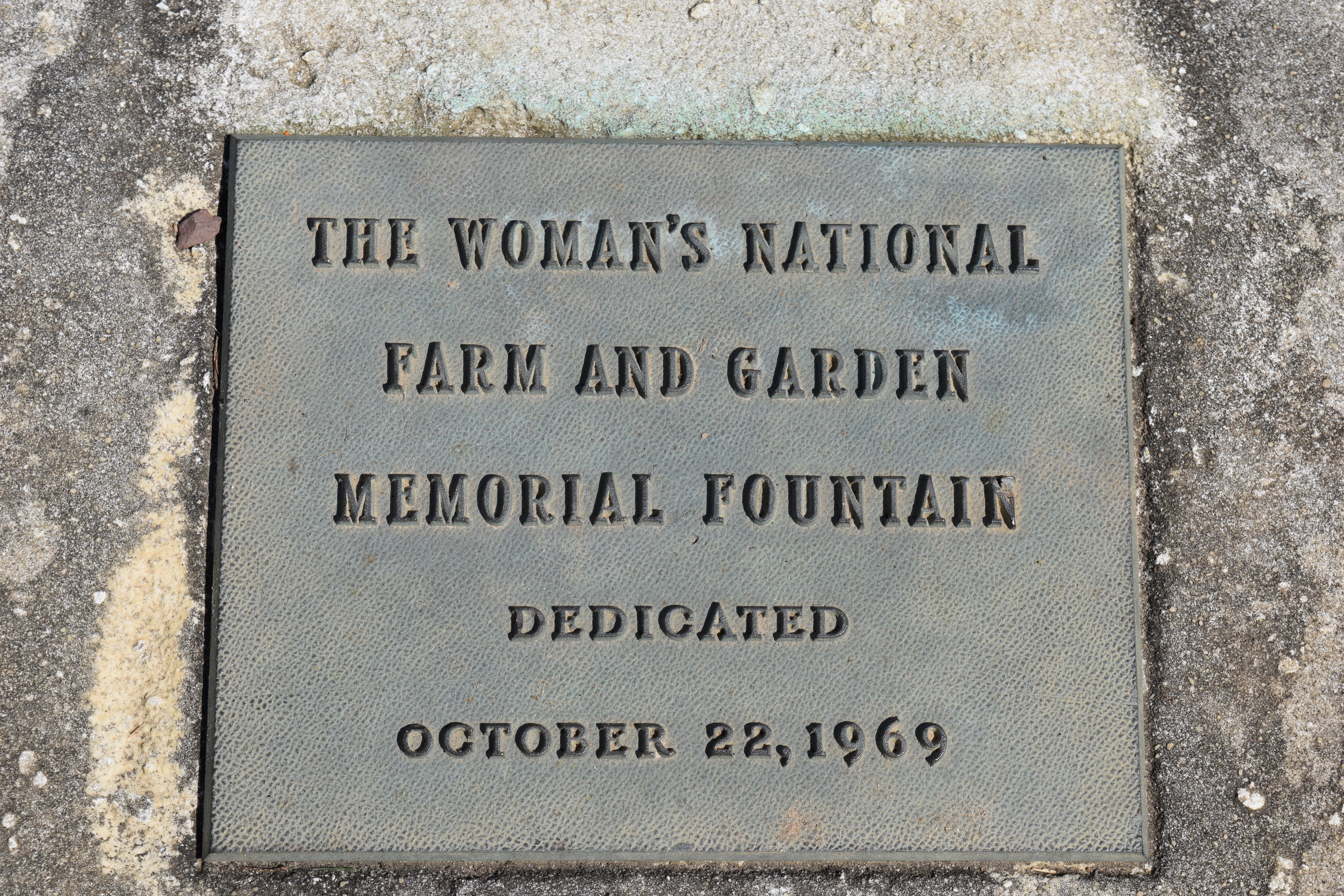
Marker for The Woman's National Farm and Garden Memorial Fountain. U.S. National Arboretum Dogwood Collection, Washington, D.C.

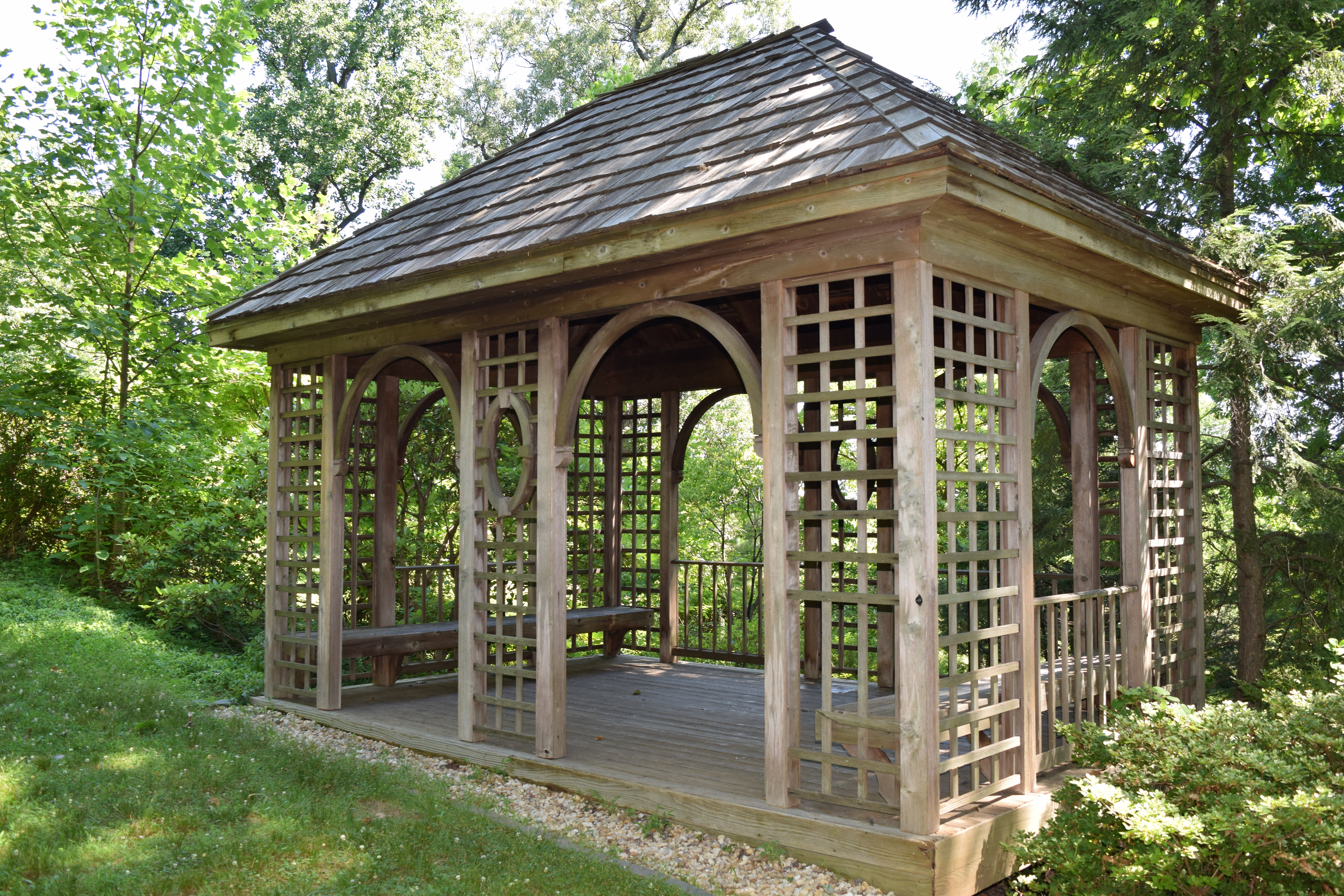
Woman's National Farm & Garden Association Diamond Jubilee Pavilion, Gotelli Conifer Collection, U.S. National Arboretum, Washington, D.C.

During World War I, with Loines as a key organizer, WNF&GA joined other groups in organizing the Woman's Land Army of America: women agricultural volunteers replaced men called into military service. The temporary workers were known as "farmerettes."

In 1940, the organization opened a shop in 30 Rockefeller Plaza, offering for sale items supplied by members: produce, preserves, crafts, needlework, and items for children. At their peak in the 1940s, there were nine Farm and Garden Shops, with four more locations in New York State, as well as shops in Boston; Winston-Salem, North Carolina; Gary, Indiana; and Ann Arbor, Michigan. The retail program was still active in 1960, but had ended by 1984.

The Sarah Bradley Tyson Memorial Fellowship, named in honor of the organization's second president, was established in 1928. It was the organization's first memorial scholarship program. A fellowship named for Grace E. Frysinger was first awarded in 1957 by WNF&GA and the Associated Country Women of the World to support "furthering international understanding and goodwill" among their memberships.

The organization was an early promoter of horticultural therapy, describing the investigations of Elizabeth Hall in an article in its magazine in 1925. In 1952, Alice Wessels Burlingame initiated a workshop that led to a nine-year study, published as Therapy Through Horticulture. In 1984, WNF&GA established a scholarship in Burlingame's name for undergraduate students in the field of horticultural therapy.

In 1952, WNF&GA established the Mrs. Francis King Dogwood Garden at the United States National Arboretum, through one of several gifts made by the organization and its divisions to the Arboretum. To celebrate the WNF&GA's diamond jubilee, the organization donated a pavilion in the Arboretum's Gotelli Conifer Collection; it was dedicated on 9 June 1989.

In 1995, the organization initiated Project Sew in collaboration with the South African Women's Agricultural Union. Completed in 1999, the project provided treadle sewing machines (which required no electricity to operate), as well as fabric, yarn, and other sewing-related supplies to rural women of South Africa as a way to clothe their families and to provide income.

The organization's archive is housed at the Arthur and Elizabeth Schlesinger Library on the History of Women in America at the Radcliffe Institute for Advanced Study at Harvard.

== Membership, officers, and organization ==
Membership is open to any person interested in the organization's objectives. Within three months of its establishment, the group had 300 members. By 1924, the number of members had risen to 4,400, and 30 years later there were 7,000. Membership peaked in 1962, at approximately 9,000. Thereafter, the size of the organization declined; by the mid-1980s, there were approximately 5,900 members. Membership in 2020 stood at 1,469.

Over its history, the organization set up branches in more than twenty states across the country, from Maine and Florida in the east to Alaska, Washington, and California in the west. Today, WNF&GA consists of various branches in Michigan, Ohio, Pennsylvania, and New York, plus members at large. The Michigan branches comprise a division.

Past presidents include King, Clara Jane Bryant Ford (Mrs. Henry Ford) (1927–1934), and Gertrude L. Warren (of 4-H) (1952–1954). The current president is Mary Bertolini.

== Recognition ==
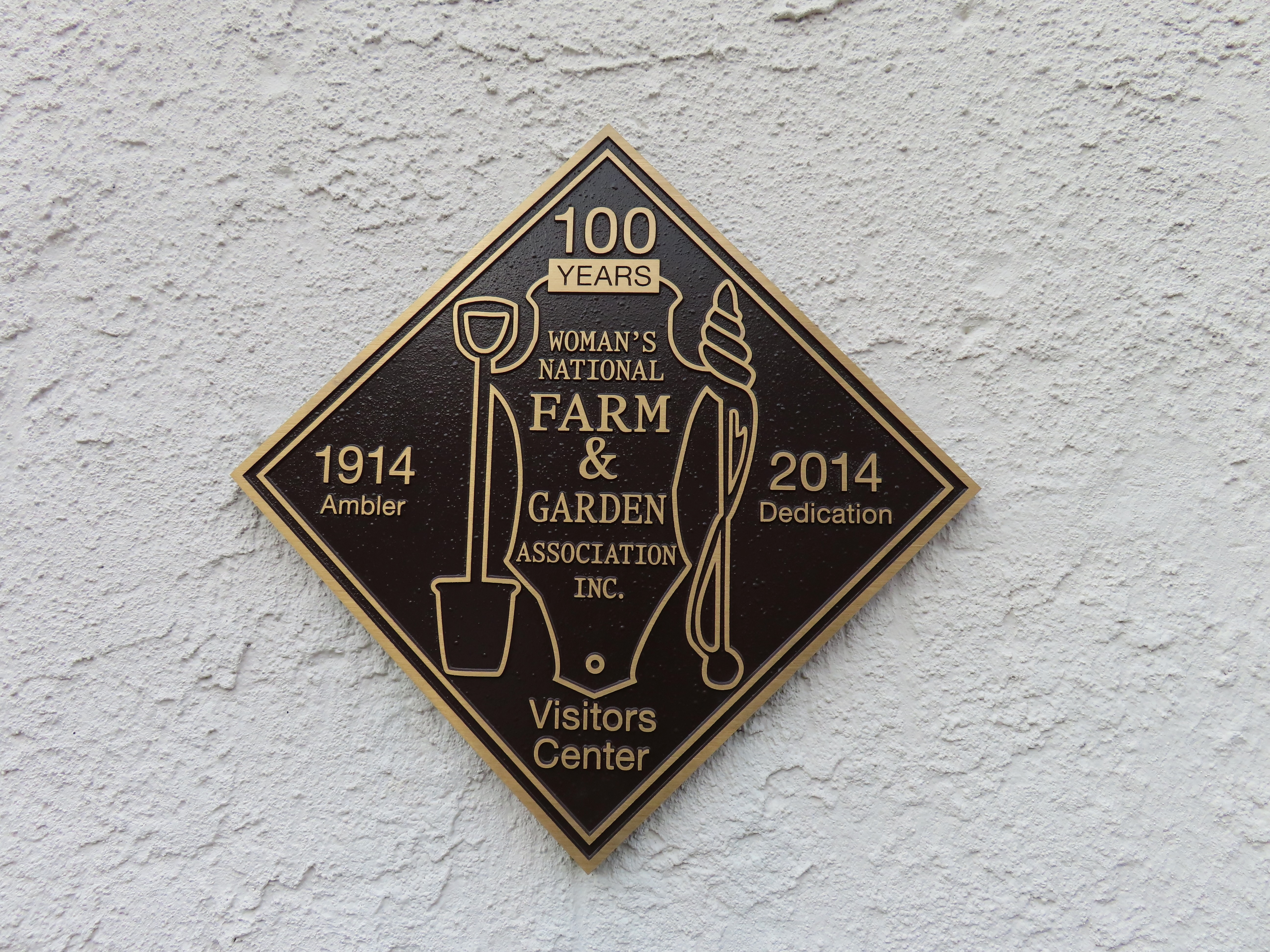
Dedication plaque, Woman's National Farm & Garden Association Visitors Center, Temple University Ambler, Pennsylvania.

The Ambler Arboretum of Temple University has named its visitors center in honor of the Woman's National Farm & Garden Association. The Ambler campus was the site of the Pennsylvania School of Horticulture for Women (PSHW), founded in 1911, as well as the founding site of the Women's National Farm and Garden Association (WNF&GA) in 1914. Artifacts from the School and the WNF&GA are on display in the Hilda Justice building at the Temple Ambler campus.

== Publications ==
WNF&GA publishes Farm & Garden twice yearly.

The magazine is a continuation of the organization's Bulletin and Quarterly, published in the early years of the organization. WNF&GA's magazine has been published under various names: Farm and Garden Magazine (1921–1926), Home Acres (1926–1957), The National Farm and Garden Magazine (1957–1964), and The Woman's National Magazine (1964–1975). From 1974 until at least 1984, it was known as The Woman's National Farm and Garden Magazine.

== Bibliography ==
- Holbrook, Cat Lea (September 2009). "Woman's National Farm and Garden Association: Additional records of the Woman's National Farm and Garden Association, 1913-2008 (inclusive), 1934-1998 (bulk): A Finding Aid". President and Fellows of Harvard College.
- Kraft, Katherine Gray (November 1973). "Woman's National Farm and Garden Association: Records of the Woman's National Farm and Garden Association, 1913-1980: A Finding Aid". President and Fellows of Harvard College.
- Nolan, Martha A. (1985). A Chronicle: The History of Woman's National Farm & Garden Association, Incorporated: 1914-1984. OCLC 924193250.
- Thompson, Maureen S. (2014). One Hundred Years of Growing and Giving: Woman's National Farm and Garden Association, 1914-2014. Woman's National Farm & Garden Association. OCLC 989821671.
