= Florence Hall (WLA) =

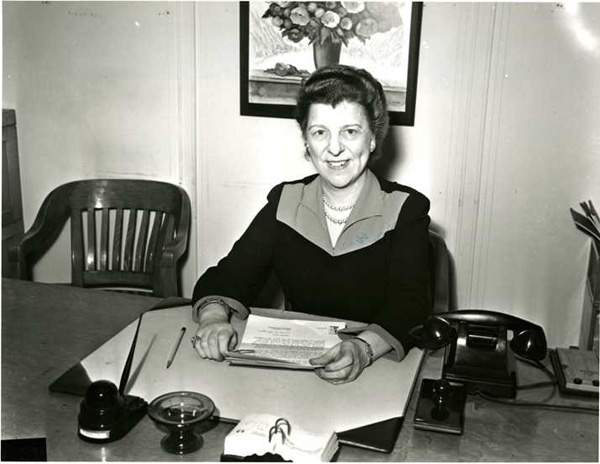
- Born: Florence L. Hall; July 31, 1888; Port Austin, Michigan, U.S.
- Died: February 16, 1983 (aged 94); Washington D.C., U.S.
- Education: Michigan State University

Florence Louise Hall was the chief of the Women's Land Army from April 12, 1943 until the end of World War II. During her term, at least one and a half million non-farm women joined the farm effort to help alleviate the wartime farm labor shortage.

Florence Hall was born in 1888 in Port Austin, Michigan. She graduated from Michigan State Agricultural College (later part of Michigan State University) in 1909 with a BS in Home Economics. Later in 1933, the college awarded her an honorary master's degree. In 1917 she was appointed home demonstration agent in Allegheny County, PA. She spent 1922 to 1928 in the Agriculture Department's Dairy Bureau, traveling in 32 states to organize “milk for health” campaigns. Rising through the ranks of the Extension Service, in 1928 she was appointed senior home economist, with responsibility for the twelve northeastern states. In 1932, Ms. Hall served as President of the Columbia Home Economics Association. And from 1938 to 1943 she served as the field agent, home demonstration work for the Home Extension Service of the Department of Agriculture.

On April 10, 1943 the War Food Administration announced the formation of the Women's Land Army to be part of the United States Crop Corps. Two days later Ms. Hall was selected to head the organization. As chief, she worked closely with home demonstration agents in the Extension Service and with state agricultural colleges to develop plans and procedures for recruiting and training women for the Women's Land Army at the state and local levels. Eleanor Roosevelt was a supporter of the Women's Land Army, and at a May 10, 1943 press conference, she introduced Florence Hall, who presented the new land army uniform to reporters.

After the war she again became Field Agent and a Senior Home Economist with the Extension Service, USDA for the 12 northeastern states from Maine to West Virginia.

In 1952, an annual award was created, the Florence Hall Award, to recognize outstanding accomplishments by members of the National Extension Association of Family & Consumer Sciences (NEAFCS). This award is presented for an outstanding program conducted by one or more NEAFCS members who have been alert in recognizing new concerns and interests of families and have involved people in planning and implementing programs that benefit families.

She died on February 16, 1983 in Washington D.C.
