= Louisa Yeomans King =

American gardener, author, and advocate of gardening and horticulture

- Born: Louisa Boyd Yeomans; October 17, 1863; Washington, New Jersey, US
- Died: January 16, 1948 (aged 84); Milton, Massachusetts, US
- Resting place: Kingstree, South Hartford, New York, US
- Occupation: writer
- Spouse: Francis King

Louisa Boyd King (née Yeomans; October 17, 1863 – January 16, 1948) was an American gardener and author who became a leading advocate of gardening and horticulture, especially in connection with the garden club movement. She wrote on horticultural topics as Mrs. Francis King.

== Early life and family ==
Louisa Boyd Yeomans was born on October 17, 1863 in Washington, New Jersey, the third of five children of Alfred and Elizabeth Blythe (Ramsay) Yeomans. Her father was a Presbyterian minister. She received secondary education from private schools in New Jersey and so far as is known did not go on to college.

On June 28, 1890, she married a wealthy Chicago man, Francis King (1862–1927), and moved to Elmhurst, Illinois, near the home of Francis's parents. The couple had three children, Elizabeth, Henry W., and Frances. Francis's parents were Henry W. and Aurelia King. The senior Kings lived at an estate called Wilder Park, which they had inherited from wealthy businessman Seth Wadhams, who had originally named it White Birch. Louisa's mother-in-law was a skilled gardener, having cultivated 200 varieties of herbs, flowers, plants, and fruit trees, and her library was well-stocked with books on horticulture. Under the instruction and encouragement of the elder Mrs. King, Louisa King developed both an academic interest in the study of plants as well as a practical enjoyment of the hands-on work of gardening: amending soils, pruning, and controlling pests.

== Career ==
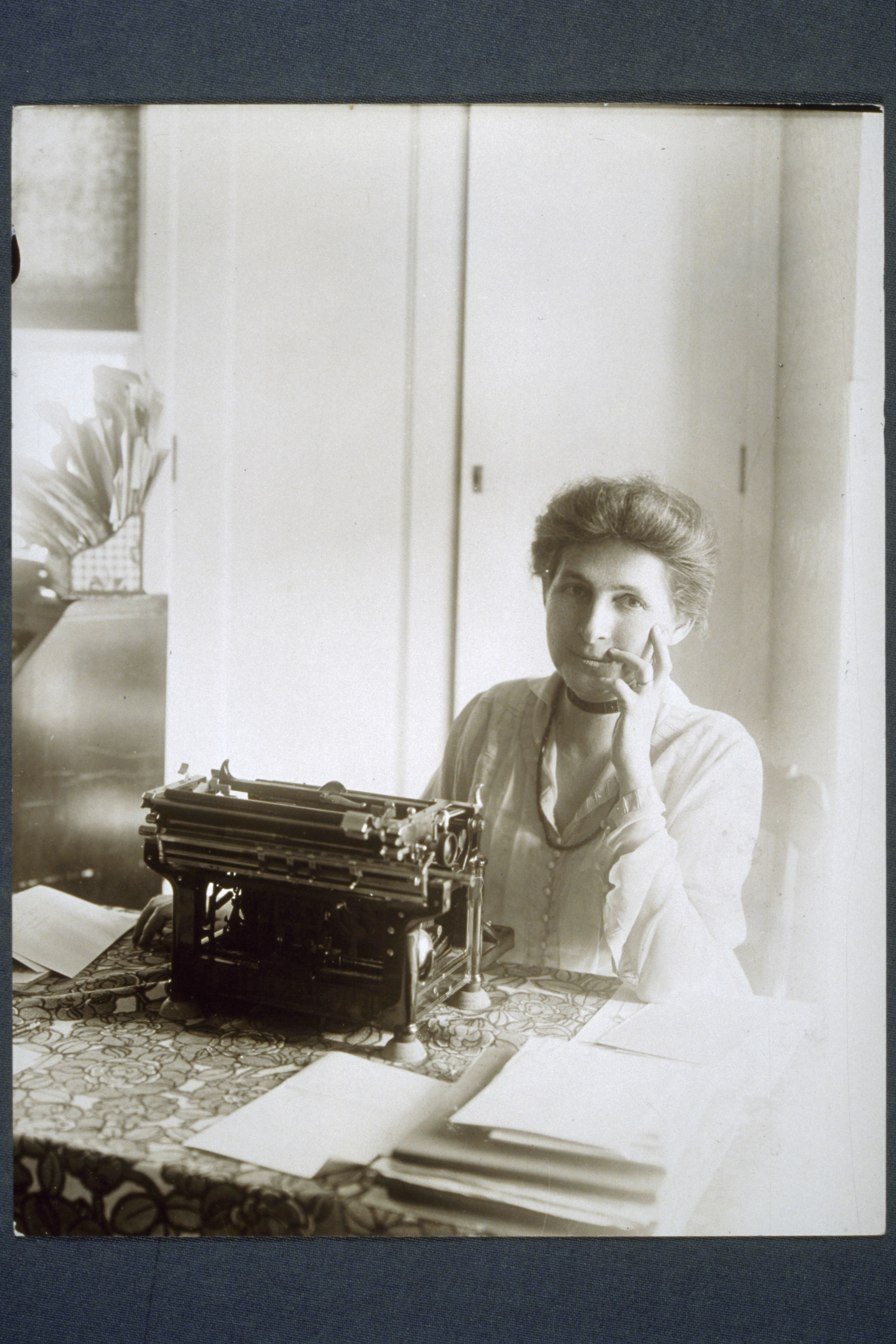
King at her typewriter

In 1902, as a result of poor health, Francis King moved to a sanitarium in Alma, Michigan. The couple built a home called Orchard House, and Louisa King began to create gardens there, with the assistance of gardener Frank Ackney. In the planning of her garden, Louisa King was influenced by the then-popular books Elizabeth and Her German Garden (1898), by Elizabeth von Arnim, and A Woman's Hardy Garden (1903), by Helena Rutherfurd Ely. The garden at Orchard House would later feature in a number of her writings.

Louisa King quickly rose to prominence as a lecturer, author, and organizer of garden clubs. By 1910, she was contributing articles to magazines such as Garden Magazine, House Beautiful, Saturday Evening Post, Garden Life, and Country Life. For three years, starting in 1922, she wrote a monthly gardening column for House Beautiful.

King corresponded with notable British and American gardeners of the day, including Gertrude Jekyll. As an advocate of "modern" gardening, King favored gardens that fit naturally into the landscape; she promoted solid fields of color as opposed to the scattered arrangements used by more traditional Victorian era gardeners. King counted among her correspondents and friends Charles Sprague Sargent of the Arnold Arboretum and landscape architects Fletcher Steele, Ellen Biddle Shipman, and Martha Brookes Hutcheson.

King's first book, The Well-Considered Garden, appeared in 1915, the first of ten books published in a 15-year period on topics such as soil management, garden planning, and tool care. It is still considered a classic, and Gertrude Jekyll, who had become a friend and admirer of King's work, wrote the preface.

King believed that gardening and garden clubs could be important forces to promote democracy and peace. In 1911, she founded the Garden Club of Michigan, serving as its first president. Two years later, she was one of the cofounders and original vice-presidents of the Garden Club of America in Philadelphia (GCA), which had a substantial influence on how landscape architecture developed as a profession in subsequent decades. In the 19020s, King and other leaders of the GCA established its headquarters in New York.

In 1914, she helped to found the Women's National Agricultural and Horticultural Association, which two years later changed its name to the Woman's National Farm & Garden Association (WNF&GA). King, who served as the first president of the WNF&GA from 1914 to 1921, saw horticulture and gardening as a means for women to establish themselves in the world; under her guidance, the WNF&GA established scholarships for women to pursue academic study of agriculture, botany, and landscape architecture. During World War I, the WNF&GA and GCA helped organize the Woman's Land Army of America: 15,000 so-called "farmerettes" worked in agriculture, replacing men called into military service. For her role in these efforts, King was awarded the National War Garden Commission’s bronze medal.

In the postwar years, gardening in small suburban plots grew in popularity, spurred by the nine-volume series of books that King edited (and some of which she wrote), known as "The Little Garden" series. These books were directed at a wider audience than that of King's earlier books, which spoke to the affluent. King's descriptive prose was supplemented by plant lists, garden diagrams, photographs, and illustrations.

== Later life and death ==
Her husband's unexpected death in 1927 forced the sale of Orchard House. King traveled in Europe and then settled in New York. She bought a home in South Hartford, New York, naming it Kingstree, and set up a smaller garden there. She established the state's first plowing contest. She continued to lecture and write; and she served as a gardening advisor to Montgomery Ward in 1936.

A supporter of the United Nations, Louisa King proposed an International Horticultural Society, writing, "Gardeners never fight with each other."

Louisa Yeomans King died on January 16, 1948, aged 84, at her daughter's home in Milton, Massachusetts; her ashes are scattered at Kingstree in South Hartford.

== Recognition and legacy ==
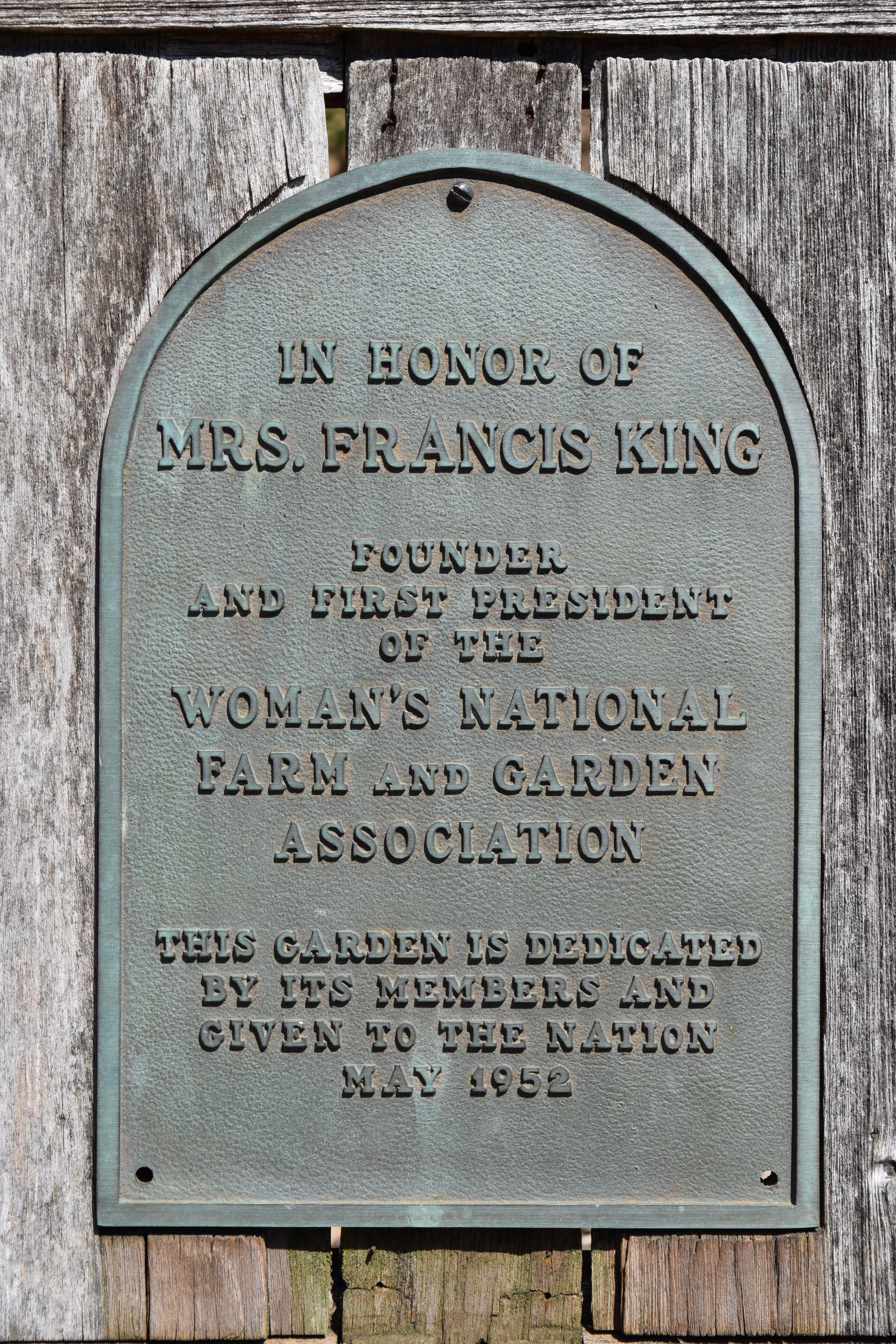
Marker honoring Louisa Boyd Yeomans King. National Arboretum Dogwood Collection, Washington, D.C.

King was once toasted by the Prince of the Netherlands, tongue-in-cheek, as the "King of America", and she has also been called the "fairy godmother of gardening in America", the "dean of American gardeners", and "the best-beloved and best-known American woman gardener" of her era. She was elected a fellow of the Royal Horticultural Society. In 1921, she became the first woman to receive the George Robert White Medal of the Massachusetts Horticultural Society. The Medal of Honor (also known as the Gold Medal) of the Garden Club of America was bestowed on her in 1923, making her the second recipient (after Charles Sprague Sargent) of one of the GCA's highest awards and one that was given out only four times in the first two decades of the GCA's existence.

Cultivars of tulip, gladiolus, and daffodil have been named for her, and the Dogwood Collection at the National Arboretum in Washington, D.C., was created in her honor.

== Selected publications ==
- King, Louisa Yeomans (Mrs. Francis) (1915). The Well-Considered Garden. New York, NY: Charles Scribner's Sons. With a preface by Gertrude Jekyll.
- King, Louisa Yeomans (Mrs. Francis) (1921). The Little Garden. Boston, MA: Atlantic Monthly Press. King's best seller.
- King, Louisa Yeomans (Mrs. Francis) (1921). Pages from a Garden Note-book. New York, NY: Charles Scribner's Sons.
- King, Louisa Yeomans (Mrs. Francis) (1923). Variety in the Little Garden. Boston, MA: Atlantic Monthly Press.
- King, Louisa Yeomans (Mrs. Francis) (1932). "American Gardens". The Story of the Garden. By Rohde, Eleanour Sinclair. Boston, MA: Hale, Cushman, & Flint.
- King, Louisa Yeomans (Mrs. Francis) (1936). Planning Your Planting. Montgomery Ward.

== The Little Garden Series ==
King was the general editor for the book series The Little Garden Series published in 9 volumes during the 1920s. She wrote 2 of the 9 books herself. The first 5 books in the series were published by the Atlantic Monthly Press. The last 4 books in the series were published by Little, Brown and Company in cooperation with the Atlantic Monthly Press. The titles and authors of the 9 volumes are:

- The Little Garden by Mrs. Francis King (1921)
- Peonies in the Little Garden by Mrs. Edward Harding (1923)
- Variety in the Little Garden by Mrs. Francis King (1923)
- Design in the Little Garden by Fletcher Steele (1924)
- The Little Garden for Little Money by Kate L. Brewster (1924)
- Roses in the Little Garden by Glendon A. Stevens (1926)
- The Little Kitchen Garden by Dorothy Giles (1926)
- Iris in the Little Garden by Ella Porter McKinney (1927)
- Spring in the Little Garden by Frances Edge McIlvaine (1928) ASIN B00085H3VG LCCN 28-8608

== Notes ==
The original greenhouse used by Aurelia and Louisa King still stands (as of 2008) at the south end of Wilder Park (now part of the Elmhurst Park District); it is believed to be the oldest extant greenhouse in DuPage County, Illinois. A major restoration of the conservatory was completed in 2014.

== Bibliography ==
- Bailey, Martha J., ed. (1994), "King, Louisa Boyd Yeomans", American Women in Science: A Biographical Dictionary, Denver, CO: ABC-CLIO, pp. 193–194, ISBN 0-87436-740-9
- Begg, Virginia Lopez (1993), "King, Louisa Yeomans (Mrs. Francis)", in Birnbaum, Charles A.; Crowder, Lisa E. (eds.), Pioneers of American Landscape Design: An Annotated Bibliography, Washington, DC: U.S. Department of the Interior, National Park Service, pp. 74–76
- Maloney, Cathy Jean (2008). Chicago Gardens: The Early History. Chicago, IL: University of Chicago Press. pp. 96–97. ISBN 9780226502366.
- Nolan, Martha A. (1985). A Chronicle: The History of Woman's National Farm & Garden Association, Incorporated: 1914-1984. OCLC 924193250.
- Seale, William (2012). The Garden Club of America: 100 Years of a Growing Legacy. Washington, DC: Smithsonian Books. OCLC 780415653.
- Oakes, Elizabeth H., ed. (2007), "King, Louisa Boyd Yeomans", Encyclopedia of World Scientists (revised ed.), New York, NY: Facts on File, pp. 398–399, ISBN 978-0-8160-6158-7
