= Ida Helen Ogilvie =

American educator and geologist

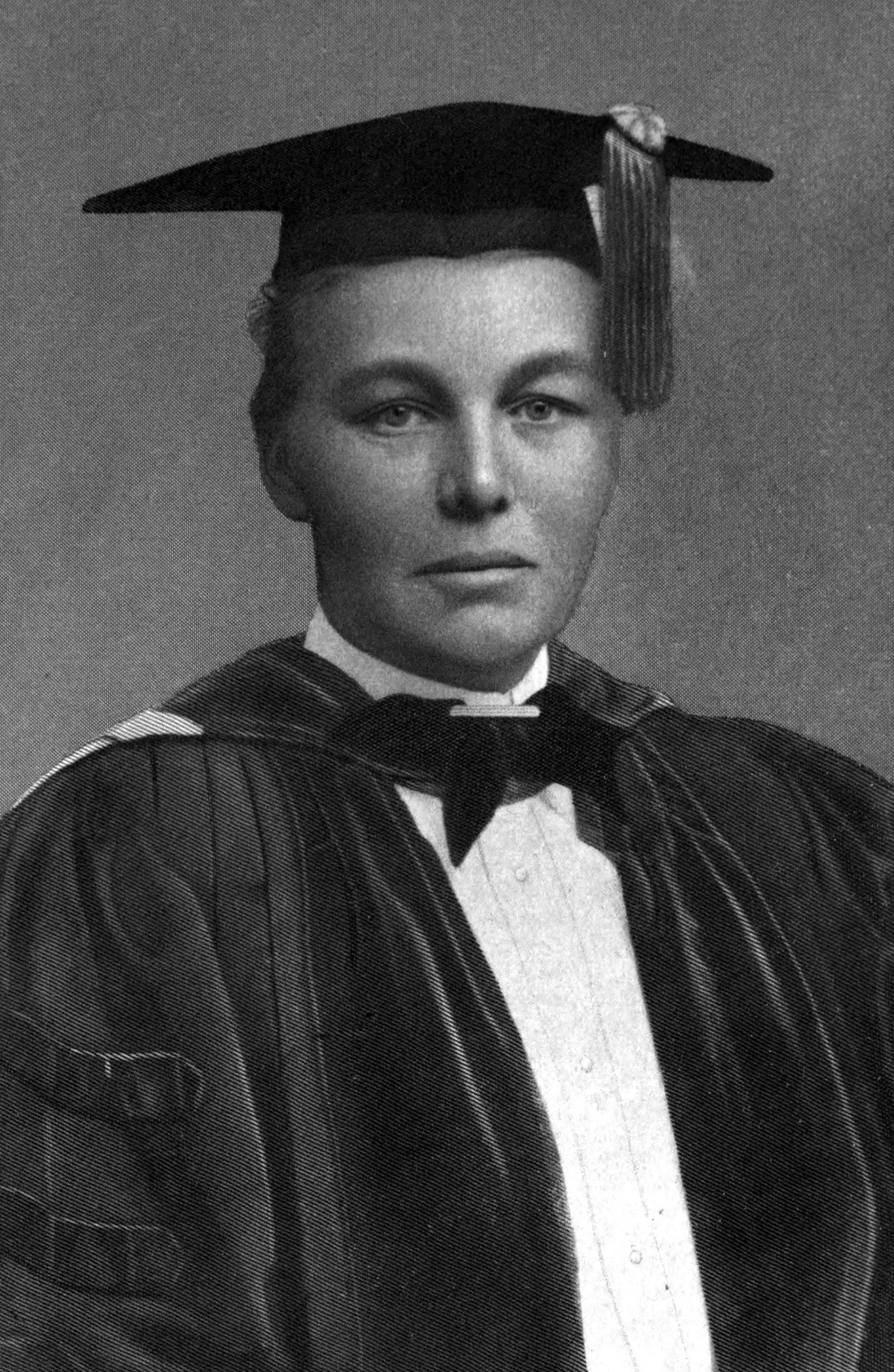
- Born: February 12, 1874; New York City
- Died: October 13, 1963 (aged 89); Germantown, New York
- Education: Brearley School
- Alma mater: Bryn Mawr College; Columbia University
- Scientific career
- Fields: Geology
- Workplaces: Barnard College

Signature
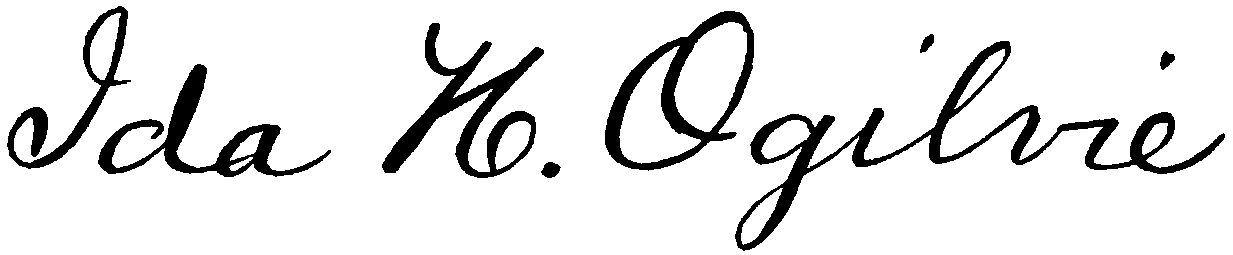

Ida Helen Ogilvie (/ˈaɪdə ˈhɛlən oʊˈgɪlvi/) (February 12, 1874 – October 13, 1963) was a United States educator and notable early twentieth century woman geologist.

== Early life and education ==
Ida Helen Ogilvie was born in New York City to Clinton Ogilvie and Helen (née Slade) Ogilvie, who were both artists. Her first language was French, then English. She was raised in a wealthy family with roots tracing back to the Mayflower, and was well travelled, attending schools in Europe before studying at The Brearley School.

She graduated from Bryn Mawr College in 1900, with majors in zoology and geology. During college, she spent her summers at the Woods Hole Oceanographic Institution in Woods Hole, Massachusetts. Ogilvie was one of the first students of Florence Bascom, who set a generation of women from Bryn Mawr onto careers in geology. After a year of graduate work at the University of Chicago where she worked with the geomorphologist Rollin D. Salisbury, she earned a Ph.D. in 1903 at Columbia University, where her advisor was the petrologist James Furman Kemp.

== Professional career and scholarship ==
Upon earning her Ph.D. Ogilvie was hired by Barnard College, where she served as lecturer or instructor until she was made assistant professor in 1912, associate professor in 1916, and full professor in 1938. Following in the footsteps of Florence Bascom, who founded the Geology program at Bryn Mawr, Ogilvie's hiring at Barnard began one of the few geology programs at elite women's colleges, as did Elizabeth F. Fisher at Wellesley College and Mignon Talbot at Mount Holyoke College.

Ogilvie's dissertation was the geologic mapping of the Paradox Lake Quadrangle in the Adirondack Mountains of New York. Fifteen-minute quadrangle maps were only just becoming available for this part of the United States, and hers was the first quadrangle report on rocks from the Adirondacks published by the New York State Museum in 1905. Ogilvie published papers on both on glacial and bedrock geology topics. Her interest in teaching at the graduate level at Columbia University, and keeping an affiliation with that department apparently encouraged her focus on the glacial topics–without a glacial specialist at that time the Columbia faculty was happy to have her teach the graduate glacial Geology course. Columbia students attended her course at Barnard, and she was the first woman teaching Geology at the graduate level at a major university (probably beginning in 1912-1913)^.

Beginning in 1917 Ogilvie became involved in the Women's Land Army, a civilian effort to encourage women's participation in farming during World War I's wartime shortage in male labor on the home front. Ogilvie was initially brought into the project by Delia West Marble, a member of the Garden Club of America, beginning their lifetime working and romantic partnership^. Marble later would later become the curator of the Barnard Geology collection, and would be remembered as a formidable presence in the department. Ogilvie toured the country for the Land Army, attending college campuses to generate interest in the program, and directed almost 150 women at ‘Bedford Camp’, the Marble family farm in Westchester County, NY. After the war had ended 20 of the women continued on at the Marble family farm.

After World War I Ogilvie was not an active researcher, focusing on managing the farm, teaching, and mentoring students. She was a fellow of the Geological Society of America, the American Association for the Advancement of Science, the New York Academy of Sciences, and member of several other scientific societies. Ogilvie retired from teaching in 1941.

== Personal life ==
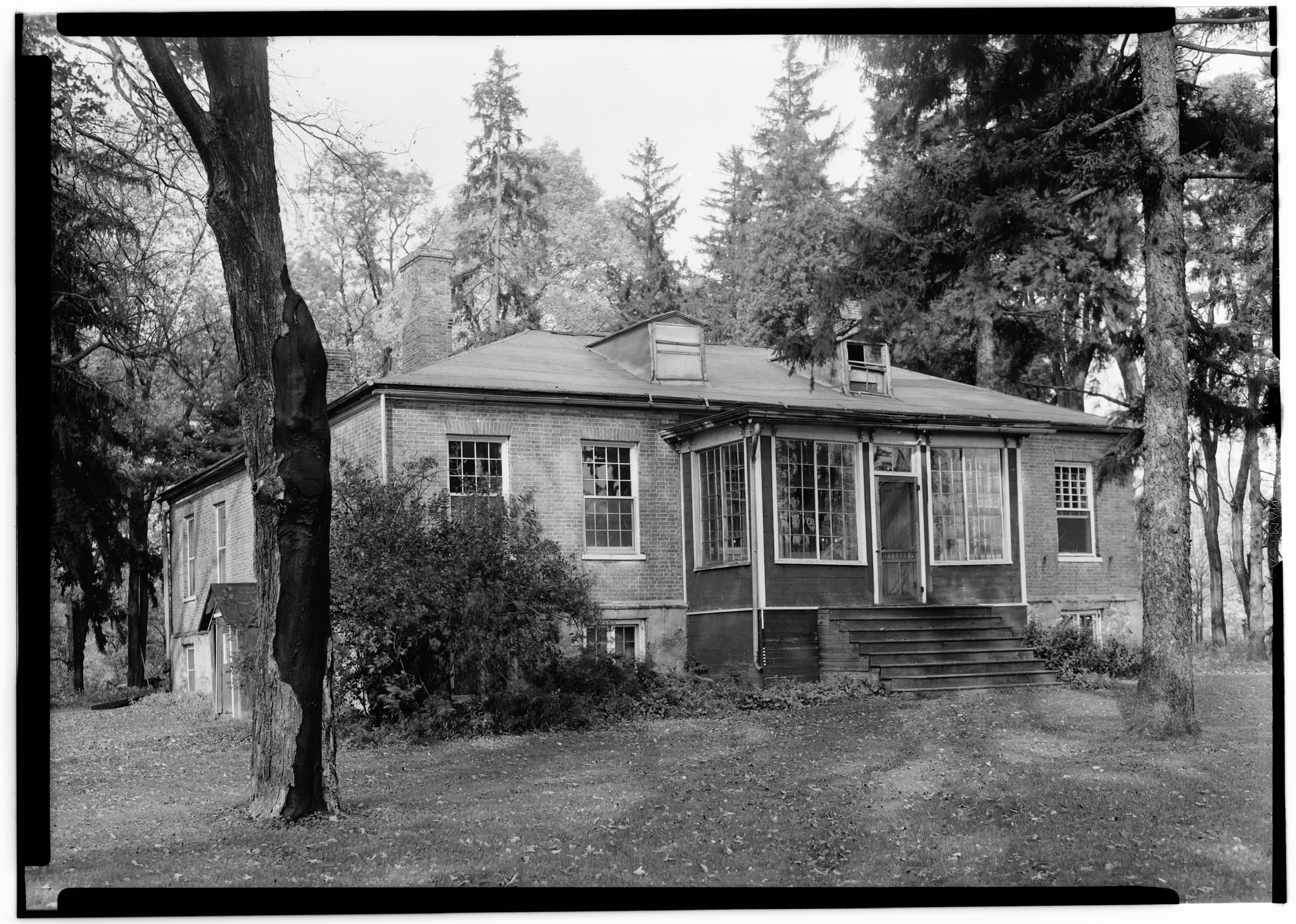
Front Elevation of The Hermitage, 1937 before her renovation

In 1930, Ogilvie purchased The Hermitage, located in Linlithgo, a hamlet in Livingston, New York. During World War II, she was involved with the Woman's Land Army of America to work in agriculture replacing men called up to the military. In this capacity, she transformed the farm at the Hermitage into a productive dairy farm, stocking it with Jersey cattle from Airlie Farm in Westchester, her partner Delia West Marble's farm. Along with her architect, Harold R. Sleeper, she finished the house in 1939 by adding "a wing and lifted the roof, adding another story and a half and a portico - a covered porch supported by columns".

Ogilvie died at The Hermitage on October 13, 1963.

== Publications ==
- Ogilvie, I. H. (1902). Glacial Phenomena in the Adirondacks and Champlain Valley. The Journal of Geology, 10(4), 397–412. http://www.jstor.org/stable/30055554
- Ogilvie, I. H. (1904). The Effect of Superglacial Débris on the Advance and Retreat of Some Canadian Glaciers. The Journal of Geology, 12(8), 722–743. https://doi.org/10.1086/621194
- Ogilvie, I. H. (1904). Geological Notes on the Vicinity of Banff, Alberta. The Journal of Geology, 12(5), 408–414. http://www.jstor.org/stable/30062518
- Ogilvie, I. Helen. (1905). Geology of the Paradox Lake quadrangle, New York ... [Albany: New York state education department].
- Ogilvie, I. H. (1906). A Contribution to the Geology of Southern Maine. https://doi.org/10.1111/j.1749-6632.1906.tb56907
- Ogilvie, I. H. (1908). Some Igneous Rocks from the Ortiz Mountains, New Mexico. The Journal of Geology, 16(3), 230–238. https://doi.org/10.1086/621509
- Ogilvie, I. H. (1945). Florence Bascom 1862-1945. Science, 102(2648), 320–321. https://doi.org/10.1126/science.102.2648.320
