= Land Girls =

Land Girls or variants may refer to:

- Women's Land Army
- The Land Girls, a 1998 film
- Land Girls (TV series), 2009
