= Garden Club of America =

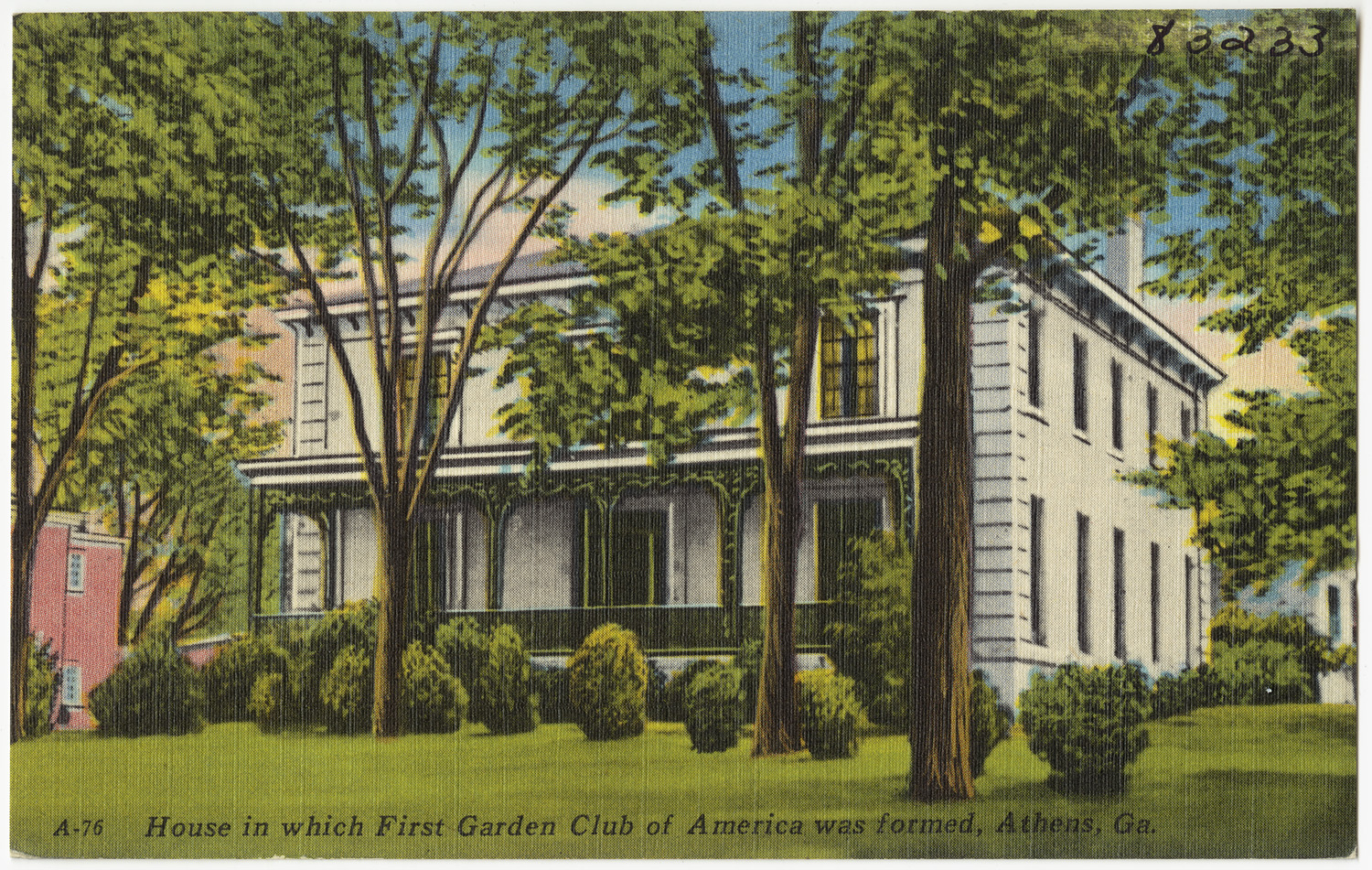
- The Athens, Georgia house in which the first Garden Club of America was formed.
- Formation: 1913
- Headquarters: 14 East 60th St, 3rd Floor New York, NY 10022
- Website: https://www.gcamerica.org/

The Garden Club of America is a nonprofit organization made up of around 18,000 club members and 200 local garden clubs around the United States. Founded in 1913, by Elizabeth Price Martin and Ernestine Abercrombie Goodman, it promotes the recording and enjoyment of American gardens as well as conservation and horticulture.

== History ==
The foundations for the organization were laid in 1904, when Elizabeth Price Martin founded the Garden Club of Philadelphia. Among its founding members were author and gardener Helena Rutherfurd Ely (1858–1920) and Henrietta Marion Grew Crosby (1872–1957).

In 1913, twelve garden clubs from the eastern and central United States signed an agreement to form the Garden Guild, later to become The Garden Club of America. Among the cofounders and original vice-presidents was Louisa Boyd Yeomans King of Michigan.

== Objective ==
The recording and preservation of the history of American gardens was an early objective, which saw the gathering of material throughout the 1920s and early 1930s, culminating in the publication of Gardens of Colony and State by Alice B. Lockwood. The book described gardens that had been in existence before the mid-19th century. At the same time, Garden Club members were instrumental in the recording of hundreds of gardens around the country by the use of lantern slides. Much of the importance lies in the documenting of many gardens that no longer exist or that have fallen into disrepair. Much of this material has made its way into the Archives of American Gardens, a unit of the Smithsonian Institution, where it has been stored since 1992.

Conservation has been another objective of the Garden Club of America, having promoted the preservation of California redwoods since the 1930s. The club also gives out a $5000 scholarship annually for field research and study of wetlands in the United States.

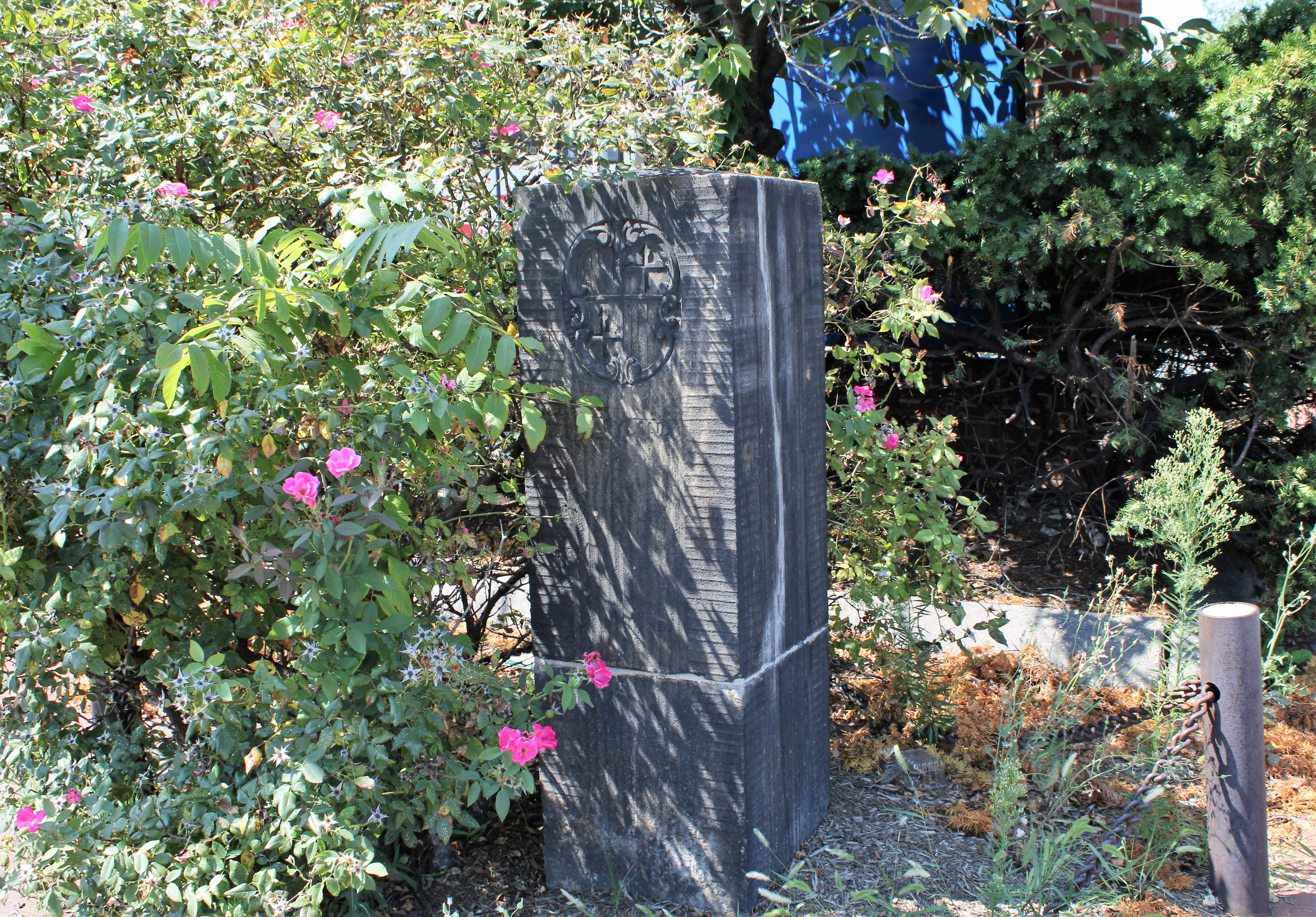
Garden Club of America entrance marker on Georgia Avenue in Washington, D.C.

In 1935, Garden Club of America members representing chapters from across the U.S. experienced an exciting three-week tour of Japan’s most beautiful gardens. The invitation to visit came from Prince Iyesato Tokugawa, in his capacity as President of the America-Japan Society and founder of the Society for International Cultural Relations. The illustration to the right presents these members on their journey to Japan.

A horticultural committee was established in 1933, and a former secretary promoted a horticultural display "Gardens on Parade" at the 1939 New York World's Fair. The 18 local branches from Nebraska, Iowa, Minnesota, Missouri, Wisconsin, and Illinois that form The Garden Club of America Zone XI support the American Flower Show Series which has been held at Chicago Botanic Garden since 1973.

== Famous members ==
- Mary Rutherfurd Jay
- Edith Gwynne Read - Rye Garden Club
- Lynden Miller
