= Robert L. Cutting Jr. =

Robert L. Cutting
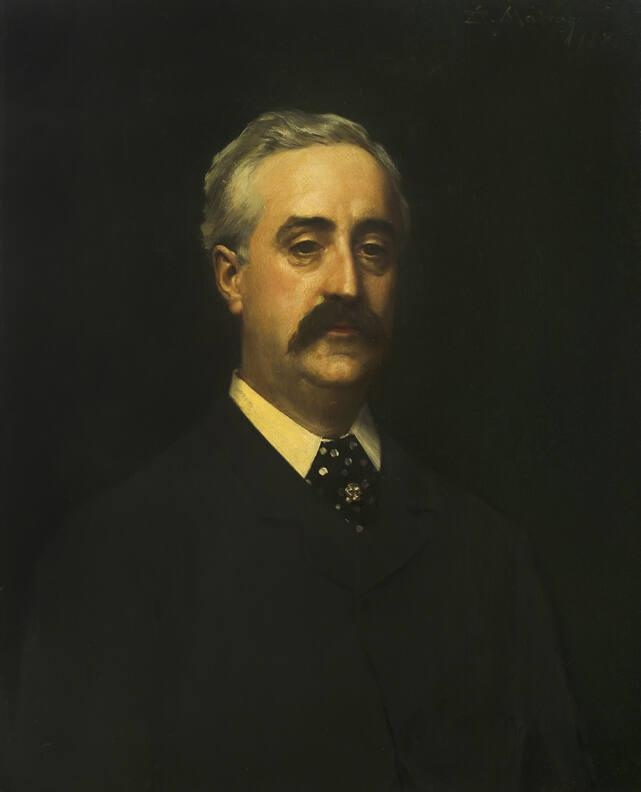
- portrait by Raimundo de Madrazo y Garreta
- Born: Robert Livingston Cutting Jr. July 2, 1836; New York City, New York, U.S.
- Died: January 13, 1894 (aged 57); New York City, New York, U.S.
- Resting place: Green-Wood Cemetery
- Education: Columbia College
- Political party: Democrat
- Spouse: Judith Carter Moale (m. 1867)
- Parent(s): Robert Livingston Cutting; Julianna DeWolf
- Relatives: Francis B. Cutting (uncle)

Robert Livingston Cutting Jr. (July 2, 1836 – January 13, 1894) was an American banker and clubman who was prominent in New York Society during the Gilded Age. He was also prominent as a municipal reformer who tried to clean New York up from Boss Tweed's corrupt influence.

== Early life ==
Cutting was born in New York City on July 2, 1836, and was known as Bob Cutting. He was the oldest of four children born to Robert Livingston Cutting (1812–1887) and Julianna (née DeWolf) Cutting (1816–1891). His father was a past president of the New York Stock Exchange and a co-founder of the Continental Bank of New York. His siblings included James DeWolf Cutting, a Yale graduate; Walter Cutting, a broker who married Maria Center Pomeroy; and Julia Cutting who did not marry. His mother was the granddaughter of U.S. Senator James DeWolf.

His paternal grandparents were William Cutting (1773–1820) and Gertrude (née Livingston) Cutting (1779–1864). Among his uncles were U.S. Representative Francis Brockholst Cutting, and Robert Fulton Cutting, who married the poet Elise Justine Bayard. His great-grandfather was Walter Livingston, the first Speaker of the New York State Assembly, and his great-uncle was U.S. Representative Henry Walter Livingston,

== Career ==
In 1862, Cutting became a special partner in the brokerage firm of Lee, Lyon & Co., with an office located at 19 William Street. The firm name was changed to John Benjamin Lee & Co., and later to Lee, Livingston & Co. In 1864, he became a member of the New York Stock Exchange.

A Democrat and a municipal reformer, Cutting served on the Committee of Seventy in 1871 which sought to oust the Boss Tweed and his cohorts from city government.

=== Society life ===
In 1892, Cutting was included in Ward McAllister's "Four Hundred", purported to be an index of New York's best families, published in The New York Times. Conveniently, 400 was the number of people that could fit into Mrs. Astor's ballroom.

Cutting was a member of the Manhattan Club, the Knickerbocker Club, the Union Club of the City of New York, the Metropolitan Club, the Racquet Club, and the Tuxedo Club.

== Personal life ==
On October 24, 1867, Cutting was married to Judith Carter Moale (1847–1915), a "celebrated Baltimore belle" who was the daughter of William Armistead Moale of Baltimore, a direct descendant of the Carter and Byrd families of Virginia. Judith's sister, Evelyn Byrd Moale, was married to I. Townsend Burden of the Burden Iron Works. Together, they were the parents of:

- Robert Livingston Cutting III (1868–1910), who married Minnie Seligman, an actress, in 1892. He was disinherited by his parents after this marriage, and was eventually sued by his mother for allegedly embezzling part of her fortune.
- John Carter Cutting (1870–1870), who died young.
- William Armistead Moale Cutting (1871–1878), who died young.
- James DeWolf Cutting (1875–1917), who was attending Yale College at the time of his father's death. He later became a broker and inherited his mother's entire estate upon her death in 1915. He never married.

Cutting resided at 141 Fifth Avenue in Manhattan. Around 1885, his wife who was an invalid for many years, moved to Paris, where she lived for the rest of her life.

Cutting died unexpectedly of Bright's disease while traveling in a Broadway cable car on January 13, 1894, at the age of 57. After a service at Grace Church, he was buried in the family fault in Green-Wood Cemetery. His funeral was attended by many prominent New Yorkers, including Cornelius Vanderbilt II, Chauncey M. Depew, J. Pierpont Morgan, Henry Clews, Judge Charles A. Peabody, Col. Stephen Van Rensselaer Cruger, and many others.
