= Joseph Aub =

Joseph Aub may refer to:

- Joseph Aub (rabbi) (1804–1880), German-American Reform rabbi
- Joseph Charles Aub (1890–1973), American endocrinologist and educator
