= Bruce Menin =

American businessman

- Born: 1962 or 1963 (age 63–64); Miami Beach, Florida, U.S.
- Education: Harvard University (AB); University of Sydney (MEc); Northwestern University (JD)
- Spouse: Julie Jacobs (m. 1999)
- Relatives: Russell W. Galbut (cousin)

Bruce A. Menin (born c. 1962) is an American real estate developer and co-founder of Crescent Heights, a privately held real estate firm based in Miami, Florida. As a managing principal, he has overseen large-scale residential and mixed-use projects in U.S. cities including Miami, New York, Chicago, San Francisco and Los Angeles.

== Early life and education ==
Menin was born in the early 1960s in Miami Beach, Florida, the son of Miriam (née Galbut) and Barry Menin. His father was a former stockbroker for Shearson Lehman Brothers and his mother was the owner of the Miami Beach Auto Tag Agency. Menin attended Miami Beach Senior High School. He graduated cum laude from Harvard University, where he received a bachelor's degree in government. Menin later earned a master's degree in economics (with honors) from the University of Sydney in Australia, which he attended as a Rotary Scholar and received a Juris Doctor from the Northwestern University School of Law, where he was editor of the Northwestern University Law Review.

== Career ==
=== Crescent Heights ===
Menin began his career as a lawyer at a New York law firm. In 1989, he co-founded the real estate development firm Crescent Heights with his cousin Russell W. Galbut and partner Sonny Kahn, becoming a principal in the business. Together, they have invested in over 35,000 residential and hotel units across the United States. From 1989 to 1994, Menin and his partners expanded their condominium conversion business in South Beach and Miami. In 1994, Menin was the company principal responsible for the Broad Exchange Building, the first office-to-residential rental conversion in the Financial District of Lower Manhattan. In 1998, Menin oversaw the new construction condominium building in Los Angeles called The Remington.

Menin led the restoration and preservation of multiple historic buildings, beginning with several projects in the Miami Beach Architectural District during the 1990s. In Los Angeles, Menin is leading the preservation and restoration of the Hollywood Palladium and sponsored the nomination of the 1940s Streamline Moderne venue as a Los Angeles Historic-Cultural Monument.

In recent years, Menin's work at Crescent Heights has emphasized transit-oriented multifamily housing in major U.S. cities, including projects incorporating public art and landscape installations.

During the 2020s, Menin continued to oversee high-rise and transit-oriented developments as Crescent Heights expanded its portfolio in Miami and Chicago. In 2022, as a managing principal, he was involved in the firm’s announcement of plans for Casa Forma, a proposed 55-story tower in Miami designed to include more than 1,400 residential units and office space for the developer and Miami-Dade County Public Schools. Crescent Heights later completed Forma Miami, a 588-unit mixed-use rental tower in Miami’s Edgewater neighborhood, and secured $238.4 million in refinancing for the property in 2025. In late 2025 and early 2026, the firm proposed Forma Suites, a separate 42-story, 360-unit mixed-use project adjacent to Forma Miami, and a two-tower residential development at 3180 Biscayne Boulevard under Florida’s Live Local Act.

In San Francisco, he oversaw the proposal for a 67-story residential tower with approximately 1,000 units at 10 South Van Ness Avenue, a project estimated at around $1 billion. In late 2025, the city approved a revised plan for the project consisting of a 67-story, 820-foot tower with 1,019 apartments that, if built as approved, would rank as San Francisco’s third-tallest building. Menin’s work at Crescent Heights also included apartment-to-condominium conversions, including a 19-story lakefront building in Chicago and a tower in Los Angeles.

In 2025, Menin was a panelist at The Real Deal's Miami Real Estate Forum in Miami, where he discussed South Florida's multifamily market alongside other developers and investors.

== Notable projects ==
In the late-1990s, Menin led Crescent Heights' conversion of the Broad Exchange Building at 25 Broad Street in Lower Manhattan from office space to residential use. In Los Angeles, he oversaw development of The Remington, a high-rise condominium tower on Wilshire Boulevard.

Beginning in the 2010s, Menin's work at Crescent Heights has included high-density projects in San Francisco and Los Angeles. One such project was NEMA, a 754-unit apartment complex in San Francisco's Mid-Market neighborhood that opened in 2013. In Los Angeles, he was involved in Crescent Heights' efforts to secure city approval that same year for the Ten Thousand residential tower at 10000 Santa Monica Boulevard in Century City. Construction was later completed under Menin's tenure as a principal on Jasper, a residential high-rise in San Francisco's Rincon Hill neighborhood that incorporated smart-home technology and related amenities.

In Chicago, projects overseen by Menin at Crescent Heights included a 76-story, 800-unit apartment tower on Grant Park that opened in 2019 as NEMA Chicago. It was the tallest rental apartment building in the city at the time. He has also been associated with Crescent Heights' acquisition and repositioning of properties including the North Harbor Tower apartment building in Chicago, a site in Boston's Seaport District, and a large Upper East Side rental complex in New York.

== Recognition ==
In 2006, the National Association of Home Builders named Crescent Heights its national multifamily development firm of the year. Several projects developed by the firm during Menin's tenure as a principal, including the NEMA apartment complex in San Francisco and the Jasper tower in the city's Rincon Hill neighborhood later received recognition from local business and real-estate publications for design and technology features. The Ten Thousand residential tower in Los Angeles received a Los Angeles Architectural Award from the Los Angeles Business Council in 2017.

== Legal issue ==
In 2015, Menin and his real estate partners were named in an enforcement action brought by the New York State Attorney General's office concerning a residential building at 165 East 66th Street on Manhattan's Upper East Side. The attorney general at the time, Eric Schneiderman, alleged that Crescent Heights sought to remove existing tenants from the property in connection with a planned condominium conversion. The complaint also alleged that tenants were offered the option to remain in their apartments for an additional six months only if they agreed to waive certain legal protections under New York housing law. Crescent Heights disputed the allegations and stated that it had complied with applicable regulations. In October 2015, the company reached a $1.7 million settlement with the attorney General's office, resolving the matter without an admission of wrongdoing.

== Philanthropy ==
Menin has served as board chair and later chairman emeritus of the Lower East Side Tenement Museum in New York City. During his tenure as chair, the museum broke ground in 2010 on a new visitors' and education center at 103 Orchard Street on the Lower East Side. Menin serves on the Board of Street Squash, an after-school academic support and physical fitness program in Harlem and Newark. He is also a Trustee of The Dalton School in New York City, and is currently co-chair of its Centennial Capital Campaign and Chair of the Facilities Committee. Menin serves on the National Advisory Council for the Sean N. Parker Center for Allergy and Asthma Research at Stanford University.

== Personal life ==
In 1999, he married Julie Jacobs in a Jewish ceremony at the Metropolitan Club. Julie Menin later served as Commissioner of the New York City Department of Consumer Affairs and Commissioner of the Mayor’s Office of Media and Entertainment. Since 2022, she has represented Manhattan’s 5th district on the New York City Council. In November 2025, The New York Times reported that Julie had secured support from a majority of council members in her bid to become Speaker of the New York City Council, and in January 2026, she was unanimously elected to the position.
