= Baiersdorf =

- Town
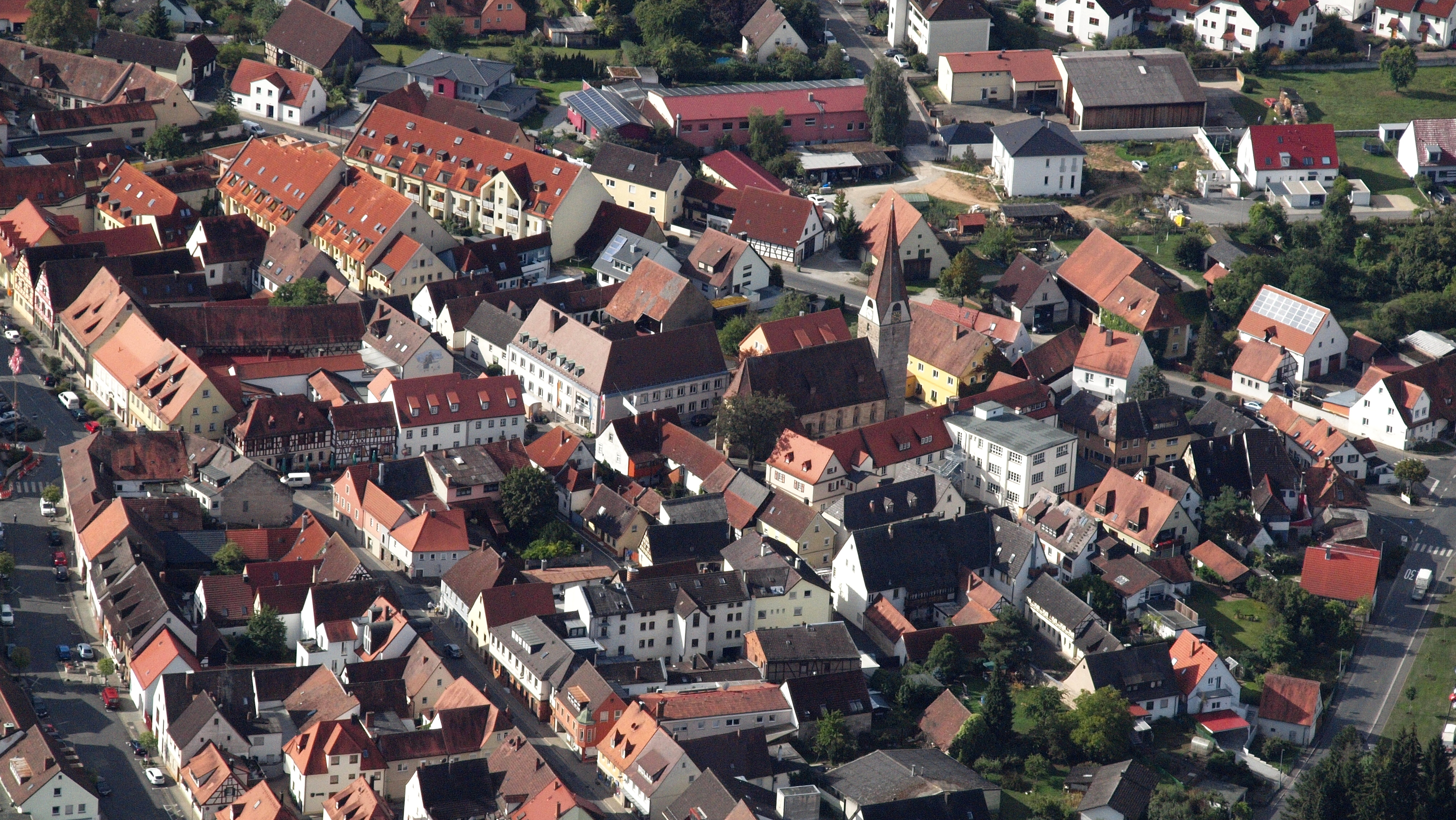
- Aerial view of the town center

- Coat of arms

- Location of Baiersdorf within Erlangen-Höchstadt district
- Interactive map of Baiersdorf
- Location within Germany Location within Bavaria
- Coordinates: 49°39′N 11°1′E
- Country: Germany
- State: Bavaria
- Admin. region: Mittelfranken
- District: Erlangen-Höchstadt
- Subdivisions: 4 districts

Government
  - Mayor (2022–28): Eva Ehrhardt-Odörfer (SPD)

Area
  - Total: 11.81 km^{2} (4.56 sq mi)
- Elevation: 269 m (883 ft)

Population (2025-12-31)
  - Total: 7,926
  - Density: 671.1/km^{2} (1,738/sq mi)
- Time zone: UTC+01:00 (CET)
  - Summer (DST): UTC+02:00 (CEST)
- Postal codes: 91083
- Dialling codes: 09133
- Vehicle registration: ERH
- Website: www.baiersdorf.de

Baiersdorf (German pronunciation: [ˈbaɪɐsˌdɔʁf]) is a town in the district of Erlangen-Höchstadt, in northern Bavaria, Germany.

== Geography ==
=== Location ===
The major part of Baiersdorf is idyllically situated on a terrace which preserves the town from being flooded by the close Regnitz river. It is located exactly between Erlangen (eight kilometers in the south) and Forchheim (eight kilometers in the north).

Neighbor cities are Forchheim, Poxdorf, Langensendelbach, Bubenreuth, Möhrendorf and Hausen.

=== Division of the town ===
Baiersdorf consists of 4 districts

- Baiersdorf
- Hagenau
- Igelsdorf
- Wellerstadt

== History ==
Baiersdorf was first mentioned in 1062 AD and has been chartered since 1460.

As Baiersdorf is famous for farming and processing horseradish, the Meerrettich Museum for horseradish ("the spiciest museum of the world") is located in the old center of the town. A horseradish queen is even chosen every year on the third Saturday in September. The margrave Johann der Alchimist (1401–1464) started the cultivation of horseradish in the region.

Baiersdorf's Jewish cemetery attests to the fact that the town has been home to Jews since the 15th century. Among others the family of Joseph Seligman who emigrated to the United States and founded an international bank lived there.

Joseph's brother James who later followed him to the United States, is the grandfather of American art collector and socialite Peggy Guggenheim.

The district of Hagenau was founded in 1939 as a German Luftwaffe base. French prisoners of war lived there. After 1945, Hagenau was a home for refugees from the Sudetenland. Today it is a part of the town, and the Karl Höfner Corporation is located there, world famous for its guitars and bass guitars.

In July 2007, the town was flooded by torrential rain. Over 1000 homes were flooded, and the Bundesautobahn was temporarily closed to traffic.

== Government ==
The City Council consists of 21 members, including the mayor.

- CSU 9 + 1 Seats
- SPD 4 Seats
- FW 4 Seats
- Ökologische Wählergemeinschaft 3 Seats

== Culture and sights ==
=== Museums ===
- Horseradish-Museum

=== Monuments ===
- A Jewish cemetery reminds of the Jewish residents of the town which were persecuted in Nazi Germany and killed during the Holocaust
- Monument for the Castle Scharfeneck
- The old Town Hall with a pillory in which the Greek restaurant "Irodion" is located today.

== Traffic ==
State road 2244 runs via Wellerstadt to junction 29 of the Bundesautobahn 73 and on to Forchheim (6.5 km north) or to junction 30 of the A 73 and on to Bubenreuth (4 km south-west). The district road ERH 5 / FO 7 runs past Hagenau to Poxdorf (2.75 km northeast) or to Röttenbach (8 km west).

Baiersdorf is on the Nuremberg–Bamberg railway line. Trains on the S-Bahn Nuremberg (line S1 Bamberg-Hartmannshof) stop here. On May 4, 2014, the S-Bahn railcar 442 222 at Baiersdorf station was given the city's name.

== Notable people ==
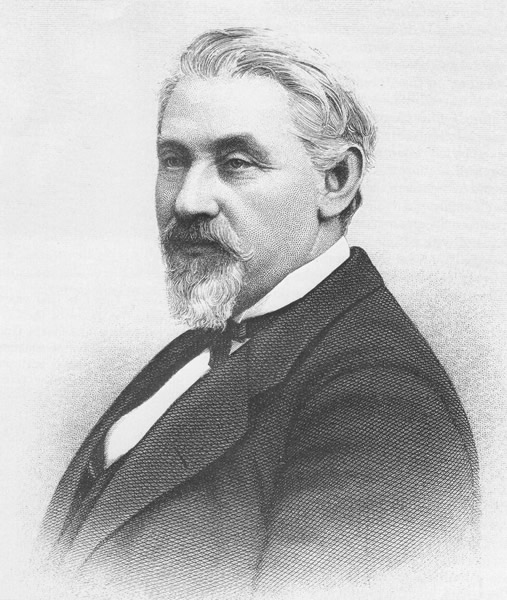
Joseph Seligman

- Joseph Aub (1804-1880), rabbi in Bayreuth, Mainz and Berlin; born in Baiersdorf
- Jesse Seligman (1827–1894), American banker, born in Baiersdorf
- Joseph Seligman (1819-1880), American banker, born in Baiersdorf
- Stefan Schwarzmann (born 1965 in Erlangen), German musician who grew up in Baiersdorf, drummer from bands like Running Wild, U.D.O., Accept or Helloween
- Hisham Zreiq (born 1968), Palestinian visual artist and filmmaker.
