= Hale Building =

Building in Manhattan, New York

Coordinates: 40.75439°N 73.97902°W

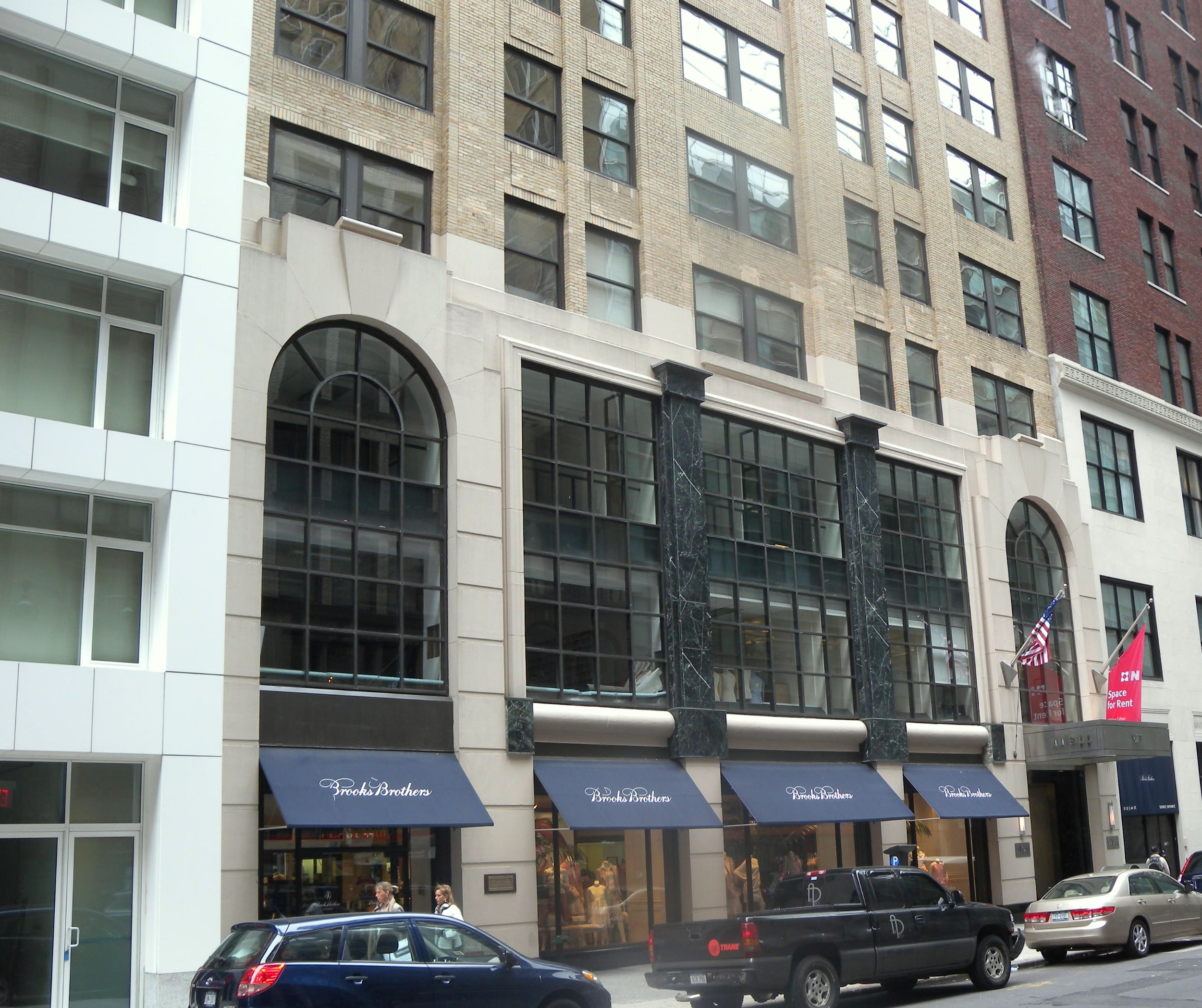
Facade

The Hale Building is an office structure which opened in 1927 at 11 East 44th Street in Midtown Manhattan, New York City. Fred T. Ley & Company built the edifice and Shreve & Lamb were its architects. It was owned by the Eleven East 44th Street Corporation. Hale Building is significant as an important residence for offices on the Lower East Side during the late 1920s and the Great Depression era.

The Hale Desk Company leased the 2nd, 3rd, and 4th floors of the Hale Building for use as its primary showrooms and executive offices. The lease, consummated in February 1927, was for a period of fifteen years. It covered approximately 16,000 square feet (1,500 m^{2}) of space.

The Hale Building was auctioned and its leasehold acquired on a winning bid of $1,750,000 in April 1936. In a judgment in which Eleven East 44th Street Corporation was the defendant, Continental Bank and Trust Company, trustee and plaintiff, was awarded the Hale Building. A judgment of $909,072 was involved. In 2008, a Brooks Brothers store opened in the Hale Building, and in 2019, it was sold to the company for $106 million.
