= Horace Brigham Claflin =

American merchant

Horace B. Claflin
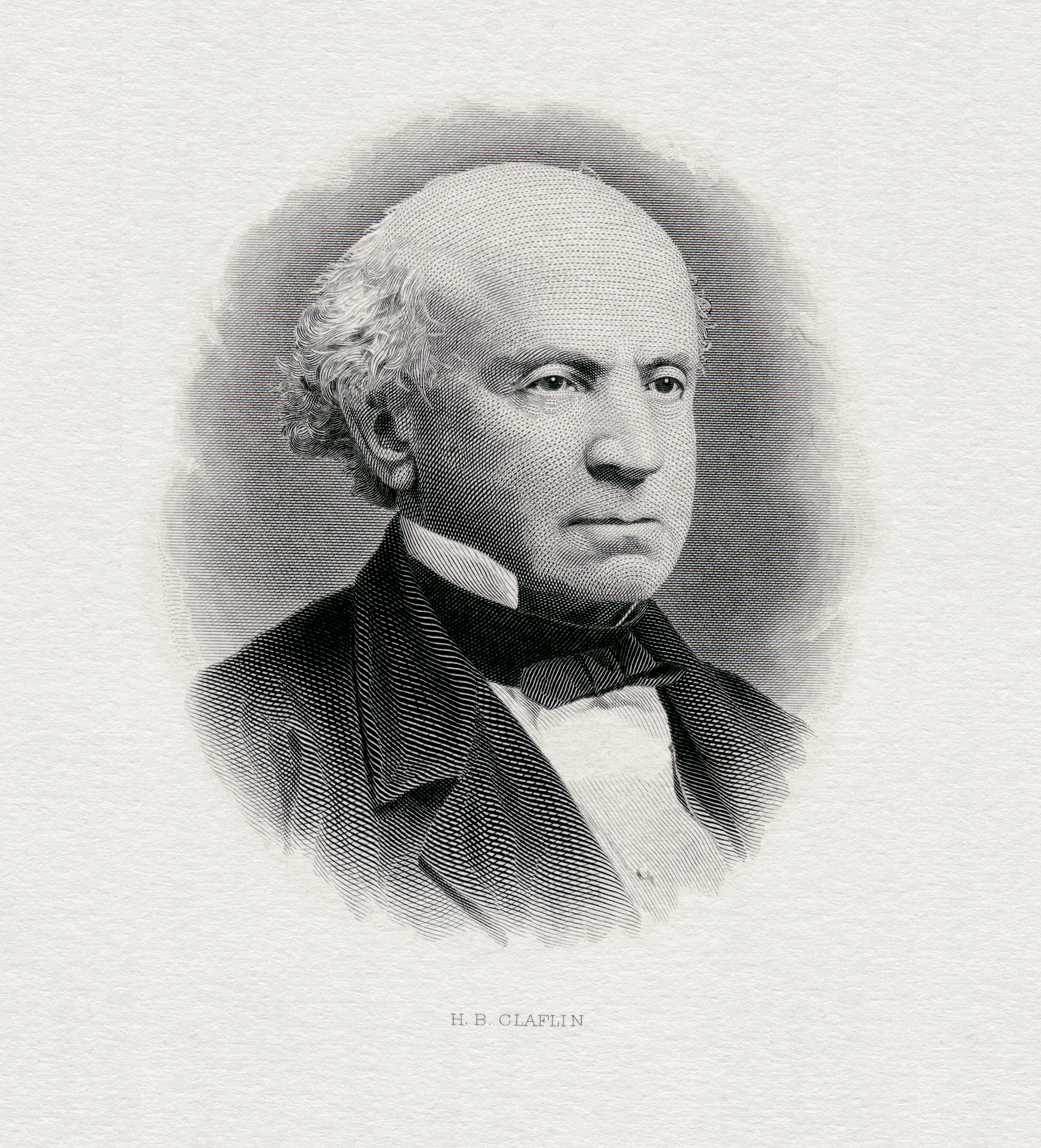
- Born: December 18, 1811; Milford, Massachusetts
- Died: November 14, 1885 (aged 73); Fordham, New York
- Education: Milford Academy
- Occupations: Merchant and banker

Horace Brigham Claflin (December 18, 1811 – November 14, 1885) was an American merchant.

== Early life and education ==
Born in Milford, Massachusetts, on December 18, 1811, Horace Brigham Claflin was educated at the Milford Academy. He is a member of the Claflin family.

== Career ==
After school he became a clerk in his father's store in Milford, and in 1831, with his brother Aaron and his brother-in-law Samuel Daniels, succeeded to his father's business. In 1832 the firm opened a branch store in Worcester, Massachusetts, and in 1833 Claflin and Daniels secured the sole control of this establishment and restricted their dealing to dry goods. In 1843 Claflin moved to New York City. Claflin became a member of the firm of Bulkley & Claflin, wholesale dry goods merchants.

In 1851 and in 1864 the firm was reorganized, being designated in these respective years as Claflin, Mellin & Company and H.B. Claflin & Company. Under Claflin's management the business increased so rapidly that the sales for a time after 1865 probably exceeded those of any other mercantile house in the world. The firm was temporarily embarrassed at the beginning of the American Civil War, on account of its large business interests in the South. The reputation of Claflin increased because of his promptness in paying off debts during the financial panic of 1873.

Along with Jacob H. Schiff, Marcellus Hartley, Robert L. Cutting, and Joseph Seligman, he was a founder of the Continental Bank of New York in August 1870.

== Personal life ==
He died at Fordham, New York, on November 14, 1885.
