= Marcellus Hartley =

American merchant (1827–1902)

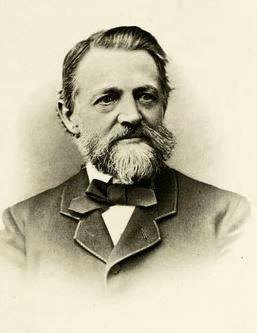
- Born: 1827
- Died: January 8, 1902 (aged 74–75)
- Occupation: Merchant

Marcellus Hartley (1827 – January 8, 1902) was an American arms dealer and merchant. He was appointed as an agent by the Union Army to purchase guns from Europe during the American Civil War. He later manufactured cartridges for breech-loading guns, owned the Remington Arms Company and diversified into other areas of commerce.

== Early life ==
Hartley was the son of Catherine Munson and merchant, Robert Milham Hartley, who was active in public health reform and the New York temperance movement.

Hartley was educated in New York and entered his father’s business at the age of seventeen as a clerk. After three years he moved to Francis Tomes & Sons, Maiden Lane, New York, and became involved with gun sales. In 1854, he started in business with partners Jacob Rutsen Schuyler and Malcolm Graham. They purchased goods in Europe and found a ready market in New York, with Hartley specializing in guns and ammunition. In 1857, a financial panic hit the country and many companies went under; the firm of Schuyler, Hartley and Graham survived and the following few years proved to be a boom period for them. In 1860, due to the threat of civil war, another panic hit the market. The company also had to defend itself in front of the grand jury when accusations were made against the partners of selling goods to the South.

== Career ==
=== Civil War ===
As war approached it became apparent that there was a major shortfall in weaponry for the armies of the North, and procurement from across the Atlantic seemed the only answer. The Secretary of War sought advice on who could act on their behalf and the name of Marcellus Hartley was put forward. His knowledge of the industry and contacts in Europe made him the ideal candidate. For the purpose of his mission he was appointed to a status the equivalent of a brigadier-general and given access to an account at Baring Brothers. In addition to buying guns he was also instructed to block the sale of weapons to Confederate agents where ever possible. (Note: Another agent with the same brief as Hartley operating in Europe at this time was Colonel George L. Schuyler)

=== Breech-loading rifles ===
When Hartley was a salesman traveling in the West in the 1850s, an acquaintance gave him a metallic cartridge as a souvenir. The majority of weapons at the time were muzzle loaded with paper cartridges. A metallic cartridge would enable rifles to be breech-loaded, but producing the ammunition had always been one of the stumbling blocks. Schuyler, Hartley and Graham purchased two small companies producing metal cartridges and started a business called the Union Metallic Cartridge Company that became highly successful due to various innovations that they introduced to the designs. Another purchase was the Bridgeport Gun Implement Company, that produced sporting guns and other sporting equipment.

=== United States Electrical Lighting Company ===
Hartley also became involved with the early development and application of electrical generation and supply. He invested heavily in the United States Electrical Lighting Company (USELC), working with inventors such as Hiram Maxim, and using the designs of Edward Weston and Moses G. Farmer. USELC eventually became part of the Westinghouse Company with Hartley on the board of directors.

=== Remington Arms Company ===
In 1888 Hartley, in partnership with Winchester Arms Company, purchased the Remington Arms Company at auction from the receiver. Later Hartley bought out Winchester’s share of the business.

== Partnerships ==
Along with Jacob H. Schiff, H. B. Claflin, Robert L. Cutting, and Joseph Seligman, he was a founder of the Continental Bank of New York in August 1870.

Hartley’s partner, Jacob Schuyler, retired in 1875; his share of the business was absorbed by the other partners and the company became Hartley and Graham. In 1899 Malcolm Graham died and the business passed into Hartley’s hands.

In later life he took interest in financial matters of several organisations, being a board member of the Equitable Life Assurance Society, the International Banking Corporation, the American Surety Company, the Manhattan Railroad Company and many more.

On January 19, 1898, at elections for the newly formed North American Trust Company, the elected members of the executive committee included Hartley.

== Family ==
Hartley’s family came from the north of England and included philosopher, David Hartley, whose son, David Hartley the Younger, was a signatory to the Treaty of Paris (1783) that ended the American War of Independence. He was also the first British politician to put the case before Parliament for the abolition of slavery in 1776. Another distant relative was James Smithson who provided the initial funding for the Smithsonian Institution.

Hartley married Frances Chester White in 1855. They had four daughters, Caroline - who died in infancy, - Emma, and twins Grace and Helen.

Emma married Norman White Dodge, son of William E. Dodge. Hartley lived at 232 Madison at the intersection of 37th Street and he gave Emma and her new husband the adjoining house. Emma died in 1881 after giving birth to their only child, Marcellus Hartley Dodge Sr. He was raised by his grandparents and eventually became heir to the Hartley business and the largest part of the Hartley fortune. (Note: The Dodge family home was adjacent to Hartley’s at 225 Madison Avenue.)

Grace married James Boulter Stokes, son of James Boulter Stokes Sr. Grace died in 1892. The two children from this marriage both died young.

Helen married George Walker Jenkins, lawyer and politician. They had two daughters, Helen and Grace.

Marcellus Hartley died on January 8, 1902, whilst attending a business meeting. It appeared that he had just fallen asleep but could not be revived.
