= Joseph Seligman =

American banker and businessman (1819–1880)

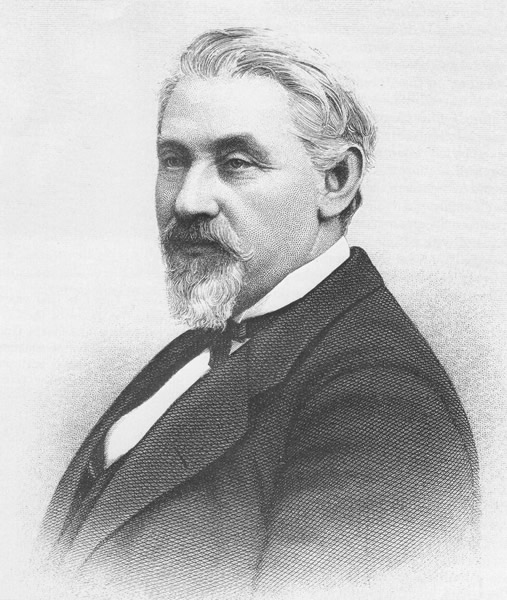

Personal details
- Born: November 22, 1819 Baiersdorf, Bavaria, German Confederation
- Died: April 25, 1880 (aged 60) New Orleans, Louisiana, U.S.
- Party: Republican
- Spouse: Babet Steinhardt
- Children: 9, including Edwin and Isaac
- Education: University of Erlangen

Joseph Seligman (November 22, 1819 – April 25, 1880) was an American banker and businessman who founded J. & W. Seligman & Co. He was the patriarch of what became known as the Seligman family in the United States and related to the wealthy Guggenheim family through Peggy Guggenheim's mother Florette.

== Early life and education ==
Born in Baiersdorf, Kingdom of Bavaria, Seligman was of Jewish ancestry. As a small child, he worked in his mother's dry goods shop. In the early 19th century Germany consisted of many independent states, most of which issued their own, differing coinages; young Joseph made a profit at his mother's shop changing money for travelers for a small fee. Joseph's father wanted him to enter the family wool business, but circumstances made this difficult. In particular, migration of the peasant class (Seligman's father's customers) from rural to urban areas meant a loss of job opportunities and a shrinking economic base in Baiersdorf. At fourteen Seligman attended the University of Erlangen. At seventeen he boarded a steamer at Bremen and sailed to America.

== Career ==
Arriving in the United States at age 18, Seligman initially settled in Mauch Chunk, Pennsylvania, where he went to work as a cashier and clerk for Asa Packer, who would later become a United States congressman. His salary was $400 a year. Using his savings from work, Seligman began selling goods door to door in rural Pennsylvania, including jewelry, knives, and smaller goods that saved outlying farmers the trouble of coming into town to buy their goods. After saving $500, Seligman was able to send to Germany for his brothers William and James, who joined him in peddling.

The Seligmans encountered some anti-Semitic abuse in their interactions with Americans, though they were not discouraged from continuing to sell.

Seligman and his brothers owned and operated several stores in Alabama, but they became uncomfortable with the institution of slavery in the South, and the rest of the family had already emigrated to New York City, leading the brothers to move north and establish J. Seligman and Brothers. Jesse Seligman ran the store's branch in San Francisco, while Joseph managed the New York City store. Despite the economic booms and busts of the 1850s and 1860s, J. Seligman and Brothers remained prosperous.

During the American Civil War, he was president of Temple Emanu-El in New York City, and would later become the first President of the Society for Ethical Culture.

Along with Jacob H. Schiff, H. B. Claflin, Marcellus Hartley, and Robert L. Cutting, he was a founder of the Continental Bank of New York in August 1870.

=== Civil War ===
During the American Civil War, Seligman was responsible for aiding the Union by disposing of $200,000,000 in bonds "a feat which W. E. Dodd said was 'scarcely less important than the Battle of Gettysburg'".

Later historians have suggested that Seligman's role in financing the war through bonds has been exaggerated. According to Stephen Birmingham, Seligman was obliged to accept "7.30 bonds" from the government as payment for the uniforms his factory was delivering. Union defeats, combined with a suspiciously high interest rate, lowered confidence in the bonds, making them difficult to sell.

In the post-Civil War Gilded Age, J. & W. Seligman & Co. invested heavily in railroad finance, in particular acting as broker of transactions engineered by Jay Gould. They underwrote the securities of a variety of companies, participating in stock and bond issues in the railroad and steel and wire industries, investments in Russia and Peru, the formation of the Standard Oil Company, and shipbuilding, bridges, bicycles, mining, and a variety of other industries. Later, in 1876, the Seligmans joined forces with the Vanderbilt family to create public utilities in New York. In 1877, Seligman was involved in the most publicized antisemitic incident in American history up to that point, being denied entry into the Grand Union Hotel in Saratoga Springs, New York, by Henry Hilton.

=== J. & W. Seligman & Co. and railroads ===
Seligman's firm made a number of investments in railroads. Among these were the Missouri Pacific, the Atlantic and Pacific Railroad (A&P), the South Pacific Coast Railroad, and the Missouri–Kansas–Texas Railroad. They also helped finance New York's first elevated railway.

After the American Civil War, nothing generated as much financial excitement as rail transportation, and the Seligmans were, at that time, the country's leading financiers. Joseph started conservatively in this sector, selling railroad bonds, but this led them to owning and operating railroads in order to protect their investments. Joseph served as director of the A&P, the Missouri–Kansas–Texas, as well as the South Pacific railroads, and in 1872, claimed that they had made a fortune in the business of start-up railroads. However, he never felt comfortable here, and suspected that they were over-invested in the sector. After the Panic of 1873 he swore never to sell another railroad bond, but in 1874 was again selling A&P bonds, touted as the only snow-free route to the Pacific. In 1875, the A&P failed, and its franchise was taken over by the St. Louis–San Francisco Railway, which was forced to sell half its A&P interest to the Atchison, Topeka and Santa Fe Railway (AT&SF). Joseph unfortunately died, five years before being able to see the AT&SF reach Los Angeles.

The Seligmans tended to generally lose money on their equity investment in railroad ventures. An example is the purchase of land in Arizona to be used for grazing cattle, which would then be transported to market on the A&P. The aridity of the desert made it unsuitable for the venture, but there remains a town by the name of Seligman, Arizona.

President Ulysses S. Grant, who befriended Jesse Seligman when he was a First Lieutenant near Watertown, New York, offered Joseph Seligman the post of United States Secretary of the Treasury, which he declined, possibly due to shyness. George Sewall Boutwell accepted the position and eventually clashed with the Seligmans.

In 1877, President Rutherford Hayes asked Seligman, August Belmont, and a number of other New York bankers to come to Washington, D.C., to plan a refinancing of the war debt. Each banker submitted a plan, but Secretary of the Treasury Sherman accepted Seligman's plan as being the most practical. It involved retaining gold reserves totaling forty percent of circulating greenbacks through bond sales.

=== Seligman–Hilton affair ===
In 1877, Judge Henry Hilton, the owner of the Grand Union Hotel in Saratoga Springs, New York, denied entry to Seligman and his family because they were Jews, creating nationwide controversy. It was the first antisemitic incident of its kind in the United States to achieve widespread publicity.

==== Background ====
During the 1870s, several incidents made Alexander Stewart hostile towards Seligman, although the two men had served together on the board of the New York Railways Company, whose president was Judge Henry Hilton, a Tweed Ring associate.

The first incident involved Seligman's declining the post of Secretary of the Treasury. Stewart, who was a friend of President Grant, was then offered the post. However, because he was associated with Henry Hilton, and Hilton with Tammany Hall, the Senate declined to confirm him.

Seligman was invited to serve in the Committee of Seventy, a group of New Yorkers who banded together to fight the Tweed Ring. Stewart's company, in retaliation, stopped doing business with Seligman.

Stewart died in 1876, having placed Hilton in charge of his estate, the largest American fortune recorded to that date. The estate included a two-million-dollar stake in the Grand Union Hotel in Saratoga, as well as A. T. Stewart's department store on Astor Place. Hilton himself was unhappy with Seligman, as he was annoyed that Seligman had not invited him to a dinner given for Grant after he became president.

==== The incident ====
After helping refinance the war debt in Washington, D.C., Seligman decided to vacation with his family at the 834-room Grand Union Hotel in Saratoga Springs, New York, where he had stayed before. Saratoga at the time was a well-regarded resort area for wealthy New Yorkers, and the Grand Union Hotel itself was the best available.

Nevertheless, by 1877 the hotel had suffered a drop in business. Stewart and, after his death, his manager Hilton believed that the cause of the decline was the presence of "Israelites" (that is, Jews) at the hotel; Christians, their theory went, did not wish to stay at a hotel that admitted Jews. Seligman was told he could not stay at the hotel.

Historians disagree as to whether the Seligman family were physically turned away from the hotel, told not to come to the hotel, or advised that they could stay only one final time. However, it is clear that the Seligmans were made to feel that their presence at the hotel was not desired and would not be tolerated long, if at all.

==== Aftermath ====
The New York Times, on June 19, 1877, ran a headline set entirely in capital letters:

A SENSATION AT SARATOGA.

_____

NEW RULES FOR THE GRAND UNION.
NO JEWS TO BE ADMITTED--MR. SELIGMAN,
THE BANKER, AND HIS FAMILY SENT AWAY--
HIS LETTER TO MR. HILTON--
GATHERING OF MR. SELIGMAN'S FRIENDS
AN INDIGNATION MEETING TO BE HELD.

A month later, The New York Times disclosed a letter in which Judge Hilton told a friend, "As [yet] the law ... permits a man to use his property as he pleases, and I propose exercising that blessed privilege, notwithstanding Moses and all his descendants object."

The case became a national sensation. Seligman and Hilton both received death threats. A group of Seligman's friends started a boycott against A. T. Stewart's, eventually causing the business to fail; a sale to John Wanamaker followed. This prompted Hilton to pledge a thousand dollars to Jewish charities, a gesture mocked by the satirical magazine Puck.

Hilton was also castigated by Henry Ward Beecher (who knew Seligman) in a sermon entitled "Gentile and Jew". After praising Seligman's character, Beecher said, "When I heard of the unnecessary offense that has been cast upon Mr. Seligman, I felt no other person could have been singled out that would have brought home to me the injustice more sensibly than he."

Whether or not Seligman meant to be turned away from the hotel to cast a light on growing antisemitism in America, the resulting publicity emboldened other hoteliers to exclude Jews, placing advertisements saying "Hebrews need not apply" and "Hebrews will knock vainly for admission".

== Death ==
Seligman died on April 25, 1880, in New Orleans. His body was returned to New York City and he was buried in Salem Fields Cemetery on May 4, 1880.

== Family ==
Joseph Seligman's siblings were, in order of birth, William (born Wolf), James (born Jacob), Jesse (born Isaias), Henry (born Hermann), Leopold (born Lippmann), Abraham, Isaac, Babette, Rosalie, and Sarah.

He married his cousin Babet (or Babette) Steinhardt in a ceremony in Baiersdorf in 1848. Together, they had five sons, David Seligman, George Washington Seligman, Edwin Robert Anderson Seligman, Isaac Newton Seligman, and Alfred Lincoln Seligman, as well as four daughters, Frances (or "Fanny", married to Theodore Hellman), Helen (married to Emanuel Spiegelberg), Sophia (married to Moritz Walter), and Isabella (or Isabelle, married to Philip N. Lilienthal).

== Posthumous honors ==
On September 27, 1880, the town of Roller's Ridge (or Herdsville), Missouri, was renamed Seligman, in honor of Joseph Seligman and in recognition of the benefits the railroad had brought to the community. In gratitude, Babet Seligman donated one acre of land and $500 towards the building of a church which still stands near downtown Seligman.
