= Henry W. Livingston House =

Historic house in New York, United States

- U.S. National Register of Historic Places
- Location within New York Location within the United States
- Location: N of Bell's Pond, Livingston, New York
- Coordinates: 42°10′36″N 73°44′58″W
- Area: 9.9 acres (4.0 ha)
- Built: 1803
- NRHP reference No.: 71000536
- Added to NRHP: February 18, 1971

Henry W. Livingston House, also known as "The Hill", is a historic home located at Livingston in Columbia County, New York. It was built in 1803 and is a massive, two-story brick dwelling coated in stucco. It has a three-bay central block with wings that terminate in octagons. The central block features curved bays and a two-story portico with four Ionic order columns and cut stone stylobate. There are also one-story curved porches with smaller Ionic columns that connect the octagons of wings to the central block. It was built by Henry W. Livingston (1768-1810).

It was added to the National Register of Historic Places in 1971.
