= Continental Bank and Trust Company =

US financial institution

Continental Bank and Trust Company of New York
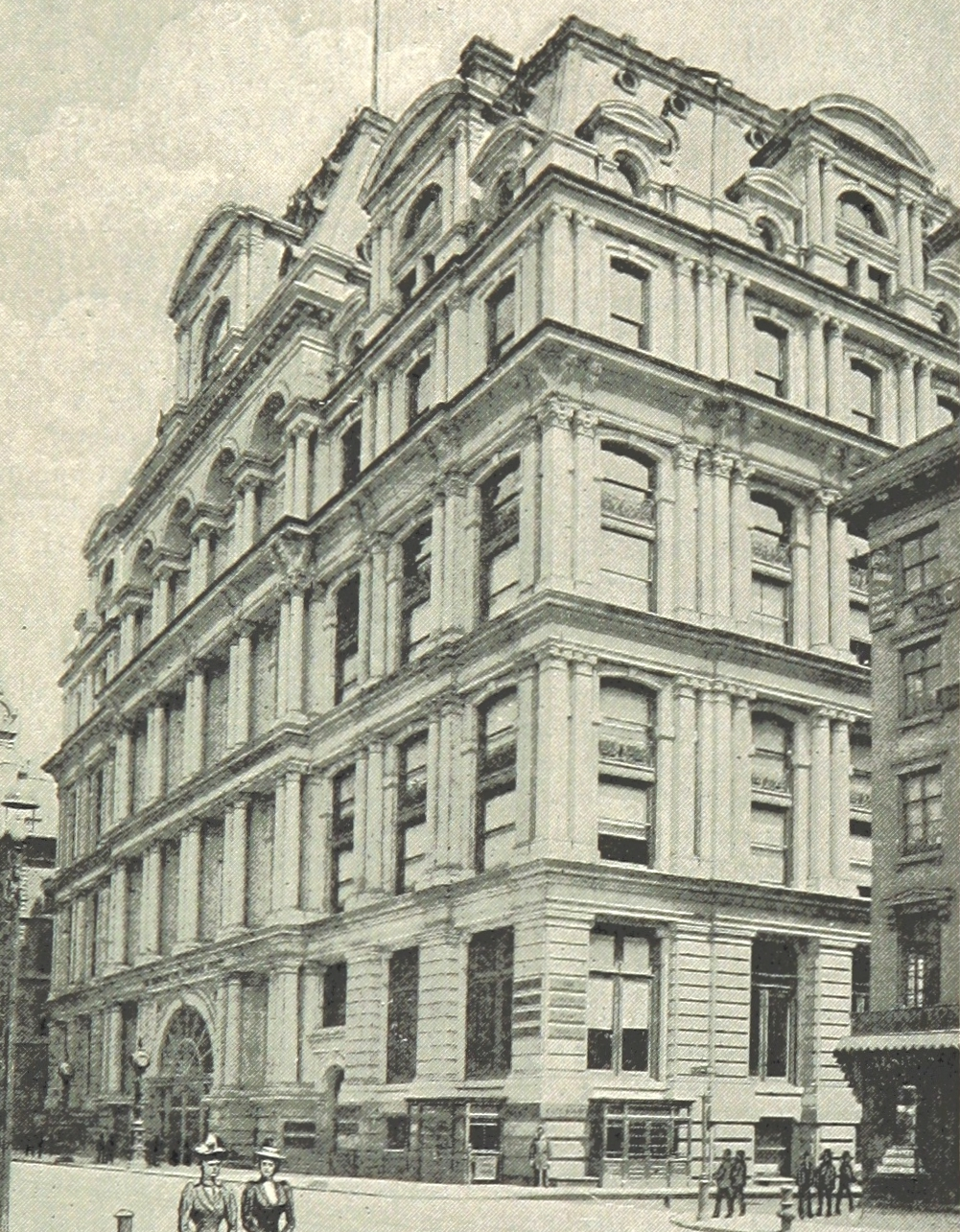
- The bank's first headquarters at the Equitable Building
- Formerly: German-American Bank (1870–1918); Continental Bank of New York (1918–1929)
- Genre: Banking
- Founded: August 1, 1870; 155 years ago in New York City, New York, United States as the German-American Bank
- Founders: Jacob H. Schiff, H. B. Claflin, Marcellus Hartley, Robert L. Cutting, Joseph Seligman
- Defunct: 1948; 78 years ago
- Fate: Absorbed
- Successor: Chemical Bank & Trust Co.
- Headquarters: 120 Broadway; 50 Wall Street 25 Broad Street (until 1932) Continental Bank Building
- Number of locations: Branches: 26 Broadway (until 1932), 565 5th Ave, 512 7th Ave, 72 2nd Ave
- Total assets: $202 million (1947)

The Continental Bank and Trust Company of New York was a financial institution based in New York City, New York, United States. It was established in 1870 as the German-American Bank, which became the Continental Bank of New York. Originally in the Equitable Building at 120 Broadway, the bank was later headquartered at 50 Wall Street, 25 Broad Street, and starting in 1932 the Continental Bank Building It became known as the "brokers bank" for its collaboration with Wall Street brokers and investment banking interests. The institution was renamed the Continental Bank and Trust Company of New York around 1929, at which point it was involved in extending its business with acquisitions of commercial banking and fiduciary operations. Acquired banks included the Fidelity Trust Company in 1929, International Trust Company and Straus National Bank and Trust Company in 1931, and Industrial National Bank later that year. In 1947, the bank earned $804,000 in net profits. As of December 31, 1947, Continental had total resources of $202,000,000, and deposits of $188,000,000. It merged with the Chemical Bank and Trust Company in 1948.

== History ==
=== 1870-1927: German-American Bank ===
The Continental Bank and Trust Company was established on August 1, 1870 at the original Equitable Building at 120 Broadway. The building was the first structure in the city to have passenger elevators. The bank went on to have its main office in several buildings, including one at 50 Wall Street facing what was then the New York Custom House. Founders included Jacob H. Schiff, H. B. Claflin, Marcellus Hartley, Robert L. Cutting, and Joseph Seligman.

Upon the United States entry into the First World War against the German Empire, the old German-American Bank became the Continental Bank of New York in 1918. Prior to the 1930s, the bank "identified during most of its career with the brokerage and investment banking interests of Wall Street," and the bank's activities expanded to also include the trust field. It became known as the "brokers bank" for its collaboration with Wall Street brokers to expand financially.

=== 1928-1929: Name change and first acquisitions ===
To encapsulate the bank's increasing work in the trust field, it was renamed the Continental Bank and Trust Company of New York around 1929, prior to a series of mergers. In 1929, "through the subscription of new money by more than three hundred and fifty Stock Exchange and Curb Exchange houses, individual partners and other Wall Street interests and the purchase of new stock by the bank's stockholders," the bank increased its capital funds from $2,500,000 to $20,000,000. It decided to erect a new building that year, and began the development process with the oversight of the bank's president Frederick Harrison Hornby. The result would be the creation of Continental Bank Building, a fifty-story building at 30 Broad Street, built cooperatively by the bank and other organizations.

Also in the fall of 1929, the bank underwent negotiations on a prospective merger of the Continental Bank and Trust Company of New York and the Fidelity Trust Company. On October 9, 1929, the boards of both issued a joint announcement that they had approved a merger plan.

=== 1930-1931: Mergers in the 1930s ===
By the 1930s, the bank was involved in extending its business with acquisitions of commercial banking and fiduciary operations.

On August 3, 1931, it was reported that on September 16, the merger of Continental Bank and Trust Company and Straus National Bank and Trust Company, both of New York, and the acquisition "by the merged bank of the International Trust Company, subject to ratification by stockholders," would be effective. On end of business on September 15, 1931, the consolidation of the Straus National Bank and Trust Company of New York with the Continental Bank was completed, and the merged institution acquired certain assets of the International Trust Company. The Continental in its enlarged form opened the morning of September 16, 1931. Chairman of the consolidated bank was Frederick H. Hornby, who had formerly been president of Continental. President C. Howard Marfield was of Straus National as former president. After the company absorbed Straus and the International Trust, Hornby relinquished the presidency and became chairman for several years, resuming becoming president in 1933.

To be effective on December 21, 1931, on December 15, the Continental Bank agreed to acquire the Industrial National Bank, with the backing of both boards. The combined company would have $53,000,000 in combined deposits, but no increase in capital.

=== 1932-1947: Continental Bank Building and new presidents ===
The Continental Bank and Trust Company opened for business on May 9, 1932, at the newly opened skyscraper at 30 Broad Street, after moving in to the Continental Bank Building the weekend before. Continental occupied basement A and B, and floors two, three, and four. The new headquarters combined the bank's previous headquarters across the street at 25 Broad Street, and its branch office at 26 Broadway. Branches remained at 565 Fifth Avenue, 512 Seventh Avenue, and 72 Second Avenue. According to The New York Times, in the decade following the bank became known as the "friendly bank," as Hornby and other officers would sit at their desks in the main banking room, where they were accessible to customers. By 1940, it was using seven floors of the building.

On August 1, 1940, the Continental Bank and Trust Company celebrated its seventieth anniversary. The day prior, the president noted that the bank had deposits of $64,475,000, and was in the "unusual position" of having 6,000 stockholders but only 3,500 depositors, a result of a policy of "developing a selective, specialized commercial banking business."

The president of the Continental Bank and Trust Company of New York, F. H. Hornby, died on October 19, 1942, after falling ill. He was replaced in February 1944 by James A. Jackson, after the presidency was assumed for several years by chairman Frederick E. Hasler. As of December 31, 1943, it had total resources amounting to $129,620,215, and total deposits of $119,437,880. Branch offices were maintained at 345 Madison Avenue and 512 Seventh Avenue. With banker Rafael Carrión Sr. one of the largest stockholders, in 1947 the bank earned $804,000 in net profits. As of December 31, 1947, Continental had total resources of $202,000,000, and deposits of $188,000,000.

=== 1948: Buyout by Chemical Bank ===
On February 14, 1948, it was reported that the Chemical Bank and Trust Company was seeking to absorb the Continental Bank and Trust Company of New York. It was said the deal would return $12,500,000 to Continental's shareholders, and transfer about $190,000,000 in resources to the Chemical Bank. it was reported that the terms were seen as "acceptable" to Continental directors, with the bank's Broad Street headquarters and two branches to become the property of Chemical Bank. John K. McKee, president of Continental, was asked to become a senior officer at Chemical, with all other officers and employees invited to join Chemical Bank as well. The board of Chemical Bank, it was disclosed, would increase from 22 to 25. Along with two other directors from Continental, Rafael Carrión Sr. became a member of Chemical's board of directors.

== Key people ==
=== Presidents ===
- Frederick Harrison Hornby - president (1928–1931, 1933–1942)

=== Directors ===
- Walter E. Cosgriff: chairman
- George M. Reynolds: chairman (as of January 24, 1928)
- Horace Henry Baxter
- Rafael Carrión Sr. (1946–1948)

== See also ==
- Hale Building
- List of bank mergers in the United States
