= 4/C =

Proposed supertall skyscraper in Seattle, Washington

- Design render of 4/C, 2022

- Site of the proposed building within downtown Seattle
- Alternative names: 4th & Columbia

General information
- Status: Proposed
- Type: Mixed-use
- Location: 701 4th Avenue; Seattle, Washington
- Coordinates: 47°36′14″N 122°19′53″W
- Owner: 4th & Columbia LLC

Height
- Roof: 1,020 feet (310 m)

Technical details
- Floor count: 91
- Floor area: 1.2 million square feet (110,000 m^{2})

Design and construction
- Architecture firm: Skidmore, Owings & Merrill
- Developer: Crescent Heights

Other information
- Number of units: 1,090
- Parking: 873 spaces

Website
- crescentheightsseattle.com

4/C, also known as 4th & Columbia, is a proposed supertall skyscraper in Seattle, Washington, United States. If built, the 1,020-foot-tall (310 m), 91-story tower would be the tallest in Seattle, surpassing the neighboring Columbia Center, and the first supertall in the Pacific Northwest. The project has been under development by Miami-based Crescent Heights since 2015 and undergone several design changes and modifications under three architecture firms. As of 2023, 4/C is expected to have 1,090 residential units—apartments up to the 64th floor and condominiums from the 65th to 90th floor—along with several coworking and retail spaces. The latest version was designed by Skidmore, Owings & Merrill.

== History ==
Crescent Heights bought the half-block property, which was home to two parking garages owned by the Costacos family, for $48.75 million in September 2015. The project was announced during the same month, standing 1,111 feet (339 m) tall with 102 stories, as the first supertall skyscraper in the Pacific Northwest and surpassing the neighboring Columbia Center, which is 933 feet (284 m) tall. Its initial design, led by LMN Architects, had a total of 1.2 million square feet (110,000 m^{2}) in gross leasable area split between 1,200 apartments, 150 hotel rooms, 160,000 square feet (15,000 m^{2}) of office space, and retail.

Concerns over the supertall skyscraper affecting traffic from nearby Boeing Field and Seattle–Tacoma International Airport prompted the Federal Aviation Administration (FAA) to review the project, similar to concerns shared with the nearby Columbia Center when it was built in the 1980s. On January 4, 2016, the FAA sent a "notice of presumed hazard" to Crescent Heights regarding the 102-story building and recommended reducing the height to 965 feet (294 m), slightly shorter than the Columbia Center, for a favorable determination. The FAA was also concerned that the tower crane required for the skyscraper's construction would interfere with helicopter operations at nearby Harborview Medical Center, resulting in a temporary closure of the hospital's helipad.

The proposal was downsized from 101 to 100 stories in February 2016, reducing the number of residential units by 100 rooms and removing half of the proposed hotel rooms. Ahead of a design review meeting in early March, Crescent Heights scaled back its plans further, proposing a 1,029-foot (314 m) skyscraper with only 93 stories to comply with the FAA's request. The adjusted height would make the building taller than the nearby Columbia Center and the U.S. Bank Tower in Los Angeles, but fall short of the Wilshire Grand Center in Los Angeles and the Salesforce Tower in San Francisco. Crescent Heights also submitted an alternative 959-foot (292 m) proposal for design review, which would fall short of the Columbia Center.

A new design by ODA named "Seattle Tower" was released in June 2020, featuring a 1,185-foot (361 m) high-rise with a large central cutout facing south to create views of Mount Rainier. The design proposal was inspired by the COVID-19 pandemic and the need for fresh air during self-isolation and quarantine, according to ODA. A revised plan submitted in October 2022 includes 1,018 residential units—of which 234 are condominiums on the upper floors—amenity spaces on the 62nd and 63rd floors, and coworking spaces. Skidmore, Owings & Merrill was listed as the architect for the project.

In November 2023, Crescent Heights listed the property for sale with an asking price of $40 million.

== Design ==
As of 2023, the revised design for the building is a 91-story supertall tower that stands 1,020-foot (310 m) at the top of its mechanical penthouse. It would comprise 1.2 million square feet (110,000 m^{2}) of interior space, primarily for 1,090 residential units that are divided between 856 apartments from the 3rd to 61st floors and condominiums from the 65th to 90th floors. These residential units would average 766 square feet (71.2 m^{2}) for apartments and 1,034 square feet (96.1 m^{2}) for condominiums; the three penthouses on the 90th floor, at 968 feet (295 m) above street level, would have up to 1,778 square feet (165.2 m^{2}) each. Amenity spaces for the apartments and condominiums would be separated between the 62nd and 63rd floors, respectively; additional coworking and lounge areas are also planned for the ninth and tenth floors.

Several retail spaces are also planned on the north side of the building. The design also includes 873 parking spaces split between an underground garage and five floors aboveground that are served using a car elevator rather than traditional ramps. In earlier designs, the garage was proposed to be built for future conversion to housing and office space, using level floor plates and pre-built components for electrical and climate control equipment.

== See also ==
- List of tallest buildings in Seattle
- List of tallest buildings in the United States
