= Sonny Kahn =

American businessman

- סוני קאהן
- Occupation: Real estate developer
- Known for: Co-founder of Crescent Heights
- Spouse: Suzanne Passi Kahn

Sonny Kahn (Hebrew: סוני קאהן) is an American businessman. He is the co-founder and chairman of Crescent Heights, a real estate development company based in Miami Beach, Florida.

Kahn was raised in a Jewish family in Israel; in 1972, he emigrated to Los Angeles. He worked at various jobs including as a taxi driver and mechanic before getting into real estate development. In 1989, he co-founded the real estate development company, Crescent Heights with Russell W. Galbut and Bruce Menin which focused on converting apartments to condominiums. He is a billionaire. He is married to Suzanne Passi Kahn.
