= Straus National Bank and Trust Company (New York City) =

Financial institution based in New York City

- Industry: Financial
- Fate: Absorbed on September 15, 1931, by the Continental Bank and Trust Company of New York
- Headquarters: New York City
- Key people: C. Howard Marfield (president)
- Services: General commercial, savings bank, and trust business

The Straus National Bank and Trust Company was a financial institution based in New York City. Founded in In 1928, in 1931 it merged with the Continental Bank and Trust Company in New York.

== History ==
=== 1928-1930: Founding and growth ===
In 1928 the Straus National Bank and Trust Company was formed, with executives such as H. S. Martin joining from the former S. W. Straus & Co. The company made its first report in January 1929. Founder Simon W. Straus died on September 7, 1930. In December 1930, Straus was replaced as head of Straus National Bank by C. H. Marfield.

=== 1931: Absorption by Continental ===
On August 3, 1931, it was reported that on September 16, the merger of Continental Bank and Trust Company and Straus National Bank and Trust Company, both of New York, and the acquisition “by the merged bank of the International Trust Company, subject to ratification by stockholders,” would be effective. On September 4, 1931, Straus National stockholders approved the proposal. The consolidation was effective on September 15, 1931, and the merged institution acquired certain assets of the International Trust Company. The Continental in its enlarged form opened the morning of September 16, 1931. Chairman of the consolidated bank was Frederick H. Hornby, who had formerly been president of Continental. President C. Howard Marfield was of Straus National as former president.

== See also ==
- List of bank mergers in the United States
- Banking in the United States
