= Robert L. Cutting =

American businessperson

President of the New York Stock Exchange
- In office 1865–1866
- Preceded by: William Seymour Jr.
- Succeeded by: William Alexander Smith

Personal details
- Born: Robert Livingston Cutting; January 19, 1812 New York City, New York, U.S.
- Died: February 25, 1887 (aged 75) New York City, New York, U.S.
- Resting place: Green-Wood Cemetery
- Spouse: Julianna De Wolf (m. 1836)
- Parent(s): William Cutting; Gertrude Livingston
- Relatives: Francis Cutting (brother); Walter Livingston (grandfather); Henry W. Livingston (uncle)
- Education: Columbia College
- Occupation: Businessperson, banker

Robert Livingston Cutting (January 19, 1812 – February 25, 1887) was an American businessperson based in New York City. At one point president of the New York Stock Exchange, he was a co-founder of the Continental Bank of New York in August 1870.

== Early life ==
Cutting was born on January 19, 1812, in New York City. He was the son of William Cutting (1773–1820) and Gertrude (née Livingston) Cutting (1779–1864). His siblings included William Leonard Cutting; U.S. Representative Francis Brockholst Cutting; Henry Livingston Cutting; Charles Grenville Cutting; Julia Gertrude Cutting; Anne Frances Cutting, who married Baron Alfred Ruebell; and Robert Fulton Cutting, who married poet Elise Justine Bayard; and Walter Livingston Cutting.

His maternal grandparents were Walter Livingston, the first Speaker of the New York State Assembly, and Cornelia (née Schuyler) Livingston. His uncle was U.S. Representative Henry Walter Livingston, and through the Livingston family, he was a descendant of Judge Robert Livingston and indirectly of Robert Fulton, the inventor of the steamboat.

He was educated at Columbia College.

== Career ==
After his schooling, he began business on Wall Street, and joined the New York Stock Exchange on June 7, 1844. Cutting was at one point president of the New York Stock Exchange, and he remained with the organization until February 1881, when he retired from active business. He was succeeded in business by his sons James and Robert Jr.

Along with Jacob H. Schiff, Marcellus Hartley, Horace Brigham Claflin, and Joseph Seligman, he was a founder of the Continental Bank of New York in August 1870.

On October 17, 1878, the Edison Electric Light Company was incorporated in New York with capital of $300,000 and incorporators including Tracy R. Edison, James H. Banker, Norvin Green, Robert L. Cutting, Jr., Thomas A. Edison, and others not including the elder Cutting. On May 19, 1879, the Edison Telephone Company of Europe Ltd. filed articles of incorporation, with Cutting and his son included among the incorporators and trustees.

As of September 1891, Cutting was a director in the newly incorporated Westchester and Putnam Railroad Company, with a starting capital of $100,000. Thomas Edison was another director, with 520 shares, and Cutting with 100 shares.

=== Society life ===
He joined the Union Club in 1852, and was a prominent member. He also was a supporter and stockholders in the Academy of Music.

== Personal life ==
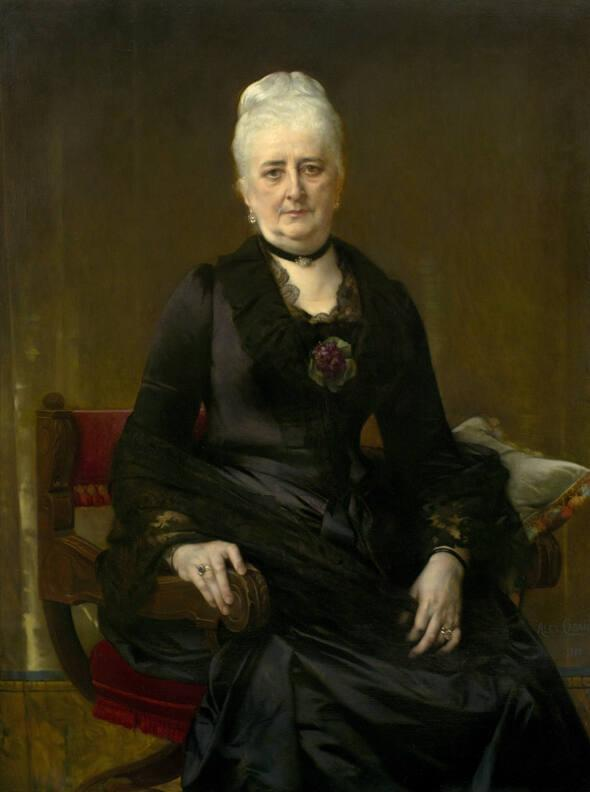
Julianna DeWolf Cutting, portrait by Alexandre Cabanel, 1888

On October 25, 1836, Cutting was married to Julianna DeWolf (1816–1891) of Bristol. Julianna was the daughter of James DeWolf and Julia Lynch (née Post) DeWolf and the granddaughter of U.S. Senator James DeWolf. Together, they were the parents of:

- Robert Livingston Cutting Jr. (1836–1894), a member of the New York Stock Exchange
- James DeWolf Cutting (1839–1885), a Yale graduate.
- Walter Cutting (1841–1907), a broker who married Maria Center Pomeroy (1845–1925).
- Julia Cutting (1843–1885), who died unmarried.

He died on February 25, 1887, at his home in New York at 141 Fifth Avenue, after being ill for several weeks. During that time, he had not visited the office of Lee & Warren, his partner Lee Warren and his son. His funeral was held on April 31, 1887. Family present included his widow, his son Robert, General William Cutting, and R. Fulton Cutting. Delegations from the Union Club and the New York Stock Exchange were also present. He was buried in the family vault in Green-Wood Cemetery.
