= Isaac Newton Seligman =

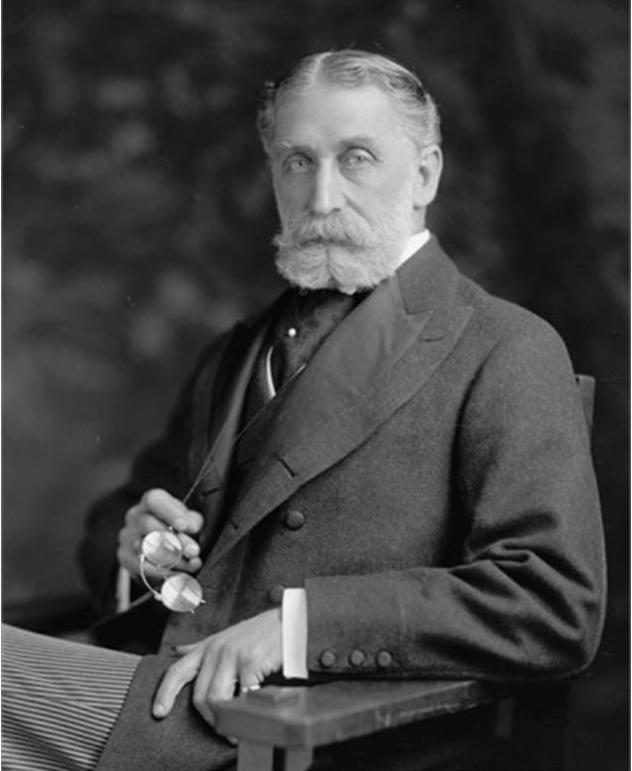
- Born: July 10, 1855; New York City
- Died: September 30, 1917 (aged 62)
- Occupation: Banker
- Spouse: Guta Loeb (m. 1883)
- Relatives: Solomon Loeb (father-in-law)

Isaac Newton Seligman (July 10, 1855 – September 30, 1917) was an American banker and communal worker.

== Early life ==
Seligman attended Columbia Grammar School and Columbia College, from which he graduated in 1876. At Columbia, he was one of the crew that won the university eight-oar college race on Saratoga Lake in 1874 over Yale, Harvard, and nine other schools.

== Career ==
In 1878, after a two-year apprenticeship in the firm of Seligman & Hellman in New Orleans, he joined the New York branch, of which he became head in 1885, on the death of his father Joseph Seligman and his brother.

He was connected with almost all the important social reform committees in New York. He was a trustee of nineteen important commercial, financial, and other institutions and societies, including the Munich Life Assurance Company, St. John's Guild, and the McKinley Memorial Association. He was a member of the Committee of Seventy, of Fifteen, and of Nine, each of which attempted at various times to reform municipal government in New York; of the last-named body he was chairman. He was a trustee of Temple Emanu-El and of the Hebrew Orphan Asylum, as well as of the United Hebrew Charities, and also a member of the Ethical Culture Society.

He was married to Guta Loeb (1865–1956), daughter of banker Solomon Loeb.

His portrait, three-quarter length seated, was painted by the Swiss-born American artist Adolfo Müller-Ury (1862–1947) but is now missing. Muller-Ury also painted the portrait of his five-year-old son Joseph L. Seligman (1886–1944) in 1891, which was exhibited in January 1892.

He died in 1917 after falling from his horse while riding to work in New York City from his summer home in Irvington, NY, a ride of about 25 miles. His estate, which was estimated between $15,000,000 and $20,000,000 went to his son and widow. He made charitable gifts of $100,000.
