= Crescent Heights (company) =

American real estate development company

- Type: Private
- Industry: Real estate development
- Founder: Sonny Kahn; Russell W. Galbut; Bruce Menin
- Headquarters: Miami, Florida, United States
- Area served: United States
- Products: High-rise residential and mixed-use developments
- Website: www.crescentheights.com

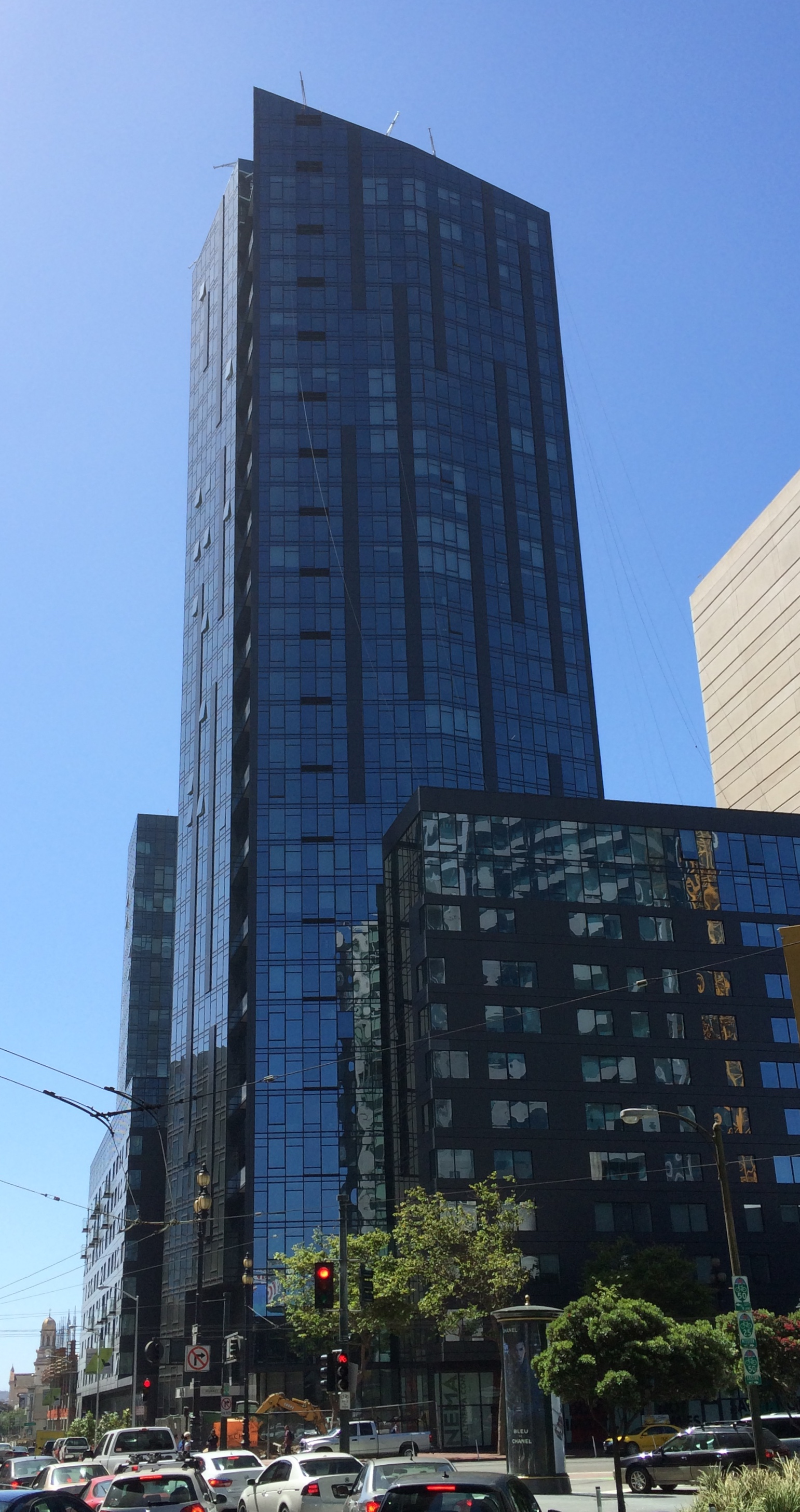
NEMA (San Francisco)

Crescent Heights, Inc., is a privately held American real estate development company based in Miami, Florida known for high-rise residential and mixed-use projects in major U.S. cities. The company is associated with partners Sonny Kahn, Russell W. Galbut, and Bruce Menin, and maintains projects in markets including Chicago, San Francisco, Los Angeles, Miami, and Seattle.

== History ==
Crescent Heights was co-founded by Kahn, Galbut, and Menin in the 1980s. It emerged as a developer active in large-scale residential and mixed-use projects in U.S. gateway markets by the 1990s. Early activity in Miami Beach included work associated with properties such as the Shelborne, the Alexander, the Decoplage, Carriage Club, and the Casablanca. In Lower Manhattan, the firm converted the Broad Exchange Building (25 Broad Street) from offices to apartments in the late 1990s and later sold the property in 2005. In Honolulu, Crescent Heights acquired the Ala Moana Hotel in 2004 and pursued a condo-hotel conversion that became effective in 2005.

== Operations ==
Crescent Heights develops, owns, and operates high-rise rental and mixed-use properties, often in central business districts or rapidly densifying neighborhoods. The company has been active in metropolitan markets including Chicago, San Francisco, Los Angeles, Miami, and Seattle.

Crescent Heights is headquartered in Miami, Florida. In June 2025, the firm sold its Edgewater headquarters property at 2200 Biscayne Boulevard, though it reportedly remained at that address on a temporary basis.

== Notable projects ==
=== Chicago ===
In 2012, the company acquired land for Grant Park-area development in the Central Station neighborhood for $29.5 million. NEMA Chicago is a 76-story residential tower on Grant Park designed by Rafael Viñoly that opened in 2019. At the time of its completion, it was considered one of the tallest buildings in Chicago. Architecture critic Blair Kamin of the Chicago Tribune described NEMA Chicago as "an instant landmark", drawing a comparison between its stepped form and that of the Willis Tower. That same year, the project was refinanced with a $340 million loan, with additional refinancing activity reported in 2021. NEMA Chicago received the 2021 Council on Tall Buildings and Urban Habitat Awards of Excellence for the Americas and for the 200–299 m height category. In July 2026, Crescent Heights secured $332 million in refinancing for NEMA Chicago, Chicago’s tallest all-rental residential tower.

In June 2023, the company acquired the North Water Apartments for $173 million, reported as among the city's highest apartment price in nearly two years.

In January-February 2024, the Chicago Plan Commission and City Council approved Crescent Heights' 53-story, 575 feet (175 m) mixed-use tower at 420 N. May Street with 587 apartments and on-site affordability.

In May 2024, Crescent Heights transferred the adjacent parcel at 1201 S. Michigan Ave. to its lender, ending plans for a second tower.

At 640 West Washington Boulevard, the firm assembled a site and advanced plans for a 47-story, 413-unit apartment tower; the site purchase and related assembly occurred in 2020.

=== San Francisco ===
NEMA San Francisco is a 754-unit, two-tower rental residence on Market Street. In 2015, the property was refinanced with a $390 million loan. NEMA San Francisco, designed by Handel Architects, has received LEED Silver certification. In early 2024, the owner reached a loan modification agreement that included a $10.5 million payment, with continued ownership contingent on meeting revised terms.

At 10 Van Ness (10 South Van Ness Avenue) in the Hub District, plans have included alternatives ranging from two 41-story towers with retail space to a taller single-tower option; the proposal has undergone multiple revisions over time. Crescent Heights filed a 2024 redesign to 65 stories (~755 ft) with a revised mix of 952 units. In December 2025, the city approved a revised 67-story, 820-foot plan for 10 South Van Ness Avenue with 1,019 residential units, ground-floor retail, and basement parking. If built as approved, the tower would rank as San Francisco’s third-tallest building.

=== Boston ===
NEMA Boston is a 22-story, 414-unit residential apartment complex at 399 Congress Street in the Seaport District built on a parcel of land purchased for $36 million in 2016. The complex was subsequently sold to KKR in 2021 for $332 million.

=== Los Angeles ===
At 1045 South Olive Street in Downtown Los Angeles, the city approved a 70-story, up to 794-unit mixed-use tower with a maximum height of roughly 810 feet.

Ten Thousand, a 40-story, 283-unit tower at 10000 Santa Monica Boulevard designed by Handel Architects, achieved LEED Gold certification in 2018.

In Koreatown, the company proposed a 34-story residential building with 297 units at 3100 Wilshire Boulevard, which incorporates preserved elements of a 1930s structure. The project remained entitled following the denial of an appeal in August 2024.

The firm is also involved with the Hollywood Palladium preservation effort and a related plan for two approximately 30-story mixed-use buildings totaling 731 market-rate residential units and 24,000 square feet of retail on Sunset Boulevard.

In Beverly Hills, Crescent Heights filed a Builder's Remedy proposal for a high-rise at 8844 Burton Way. Initially presented in early 2024 as a 20-story structure with about 200 apartments, the project was revised in 2025 to a 26-story design by Large Architecture.

=== Orange County ===
In April 2025, Crescent Heights acquired Skyline OC, a 349-unit residential property in Santa Ana’s South Coast Metro area, for approximately $239.6 million. The property consists of two 25-story towers that are the tallest residential buildings in Orange County. In June 2026, Crescent Heights secured a $210 million loan for the property’s conversion from rental apartments to condominiums.

=== Miami ===
In 2017, at 600 Alton Road in Miami Beach, the company started a project that included 500 residential units, 60,000 square feet of commercial space, and a three-acre public park.

In Edgewater/Midtown Miami, Crescent Heights developed the 39-story Forma Miami (formerly NEMA Miami), totaling 588 rental units and more than 50,000 square feet of retail. The project was capitalized with a $224 million construction loan in 2022; topped off in 2023, and includes a Whole Foods Market that opened on June 26, 2025 at 2910 Biscayne Boulevard. In October 2025, Walker & Dunlop arranged a $238.4 million agency refinancing for Forma Miami. In December 2025, Miami’s Urban Development Review Board approved plans for Forma Suites, a separate 42-story mixed-use project at 200 Northeast 30th Street with 360 apartments and office and retail space. In January 2026, Crescent Heights proposed a separate two-tower development at 3180 Biscayne Boulevard under Florida’s Live Local Act, comprising 527 workforce units in one building and 780 market-rate units in a taller tower.

In June 2026, Miami-Dade County Public Schools considered reviving a land-swap agreement with Crescent Heights under which the district would convey Parcel 7 to the developer in exchange for district office space, an auditorium, and parking within a planned mixed-use tower.

=== Atlanta ===
In Buckhead, Crescent Heights started converting the high-rise at 2460 Peachtree Road (built 1984) from apartments to condominiums, rebranding the property as Panorama.

== Former projects ==
Crescent Heights assembled and entitled a two-tower site at 1901 Minor Avenue in the Denny Triangle and sold it to Concord Pacific in August 2019 for $72 million. The separate 4th & Columbia (4/C) downtown site has been entitled for a very tall tower; the property was listed for sale in 2024, and as of late 2025, no construction activity or development timeline has been publicly announced.

== Notable earlier activity ==
The firm's 2005 conversion of the Ala Moana Hotel into a condo-hotel is documented by state filings and local press, with the condominium registration becoming effective on July 7, 2005.

== See also ==
- Skyscraper
- Adaptive reuse
- Transit-oriented development
- Multi-family residential
- Urban infill
- Urban redevelopment
