= Russell W. Galbut =

American lawyer and real estate developer

- Born: Russell William Galbut; October 20, 1952 (age 73); Miami Beach, Florida, U.S.
- Education: Cornell University; University of Miami School of Law
- Occupations: Lawyer, real estate developer, philanthropist
- Spouse: Ronalee Eisenberg
- Parent(s): Hyman P. Galbut; Bessie Galbut
- Relatives: Bruce Menin (cousin); Julie Menin (cousin-in-law); Jared Galbut (nephew)

Russell William Galbut (born October 20, 1952) is an American lawyer, CPA, real estate developer and philanthropist. He is the co-founder of Crescent Heights, a real estate development company.

== Early life ==
Galbut was born to a Jewish family in Miami Beach, Florida circa 1953. His paternal grandparents, Abraham and Bessie Galbut, settled in Miami Beach in 1931 where they opened a 24-hour drugstore-restaurant which became the go-to place for local politicians. His father, Hyman P. Galbut, was an attorney who also served as a captain in the United States Navy, and as a city commissioner. His mother, Bessie Galbut, was a philanthropist; the Bessie M. Galbut Daughters of Israel Mikvah Center in Miami Beach is named in her honor.

Galbut has three brothers: Dr. Robert Galbut, Dr. David Galbut and Abraham Galbut. He is a graduate of Rabbi Alexander S. Gross Hebrew Academy.

In 1974, he graduated from the School of Hotel Administration at Cornell University. In 1980, he received a JD from the University of Miami School of Law, and also earned his CPA certification in Florida.

== Career ==
Galbut started his career at Laventhol & Horwath, an accounting firm which went bankrupt in 1990. Meanwhile, he became a real estate developer in Miami where he built apartment buildings and shopping malls. He later built a chain of retirement facilities in South Florida. In 1983, he acquired The Shelborne, a hotel in Miami.

With his cousin Bruce Menin and business partner Sonny Kahn, Galbut co-founded Crescent Heights, a real estate development company, in 1989. In Miami Beach, they built The Alexander, The Decoplage, Carriage Club, and The Casablanca. They also built 35,000 residential units across the United States.

Galbut served on the board of directors of Norwegian Cruise Line, and is a member of the American Arbitration Association.

The Miami Beach Chamber of Commerce awarded Galbut the Champion of Business Award in 2014.

== Philanthropy ==
Galbut serves as the chairman of Colel Chabad, a non-profit organization which runs soup kitchens in Israel. Additionally, he serves on the board of trustees of the Simon Wiesenthal Center in Los Angeles, California.

Galbut serves on the advisory board of the Center for Real Estate and Finance in the School of Hotel Administration at his alma mater, Cornell University.

== Personal life ==
Galbut resides in South Beach, a neighborhood of Miami Beach, Florida. His father-in-law, Seymour "Sy" Joseph Eisenberg, who died in 2021, was a City of Miami Beach commissioner.
