= Jacob Schiff =

American businessman and banker

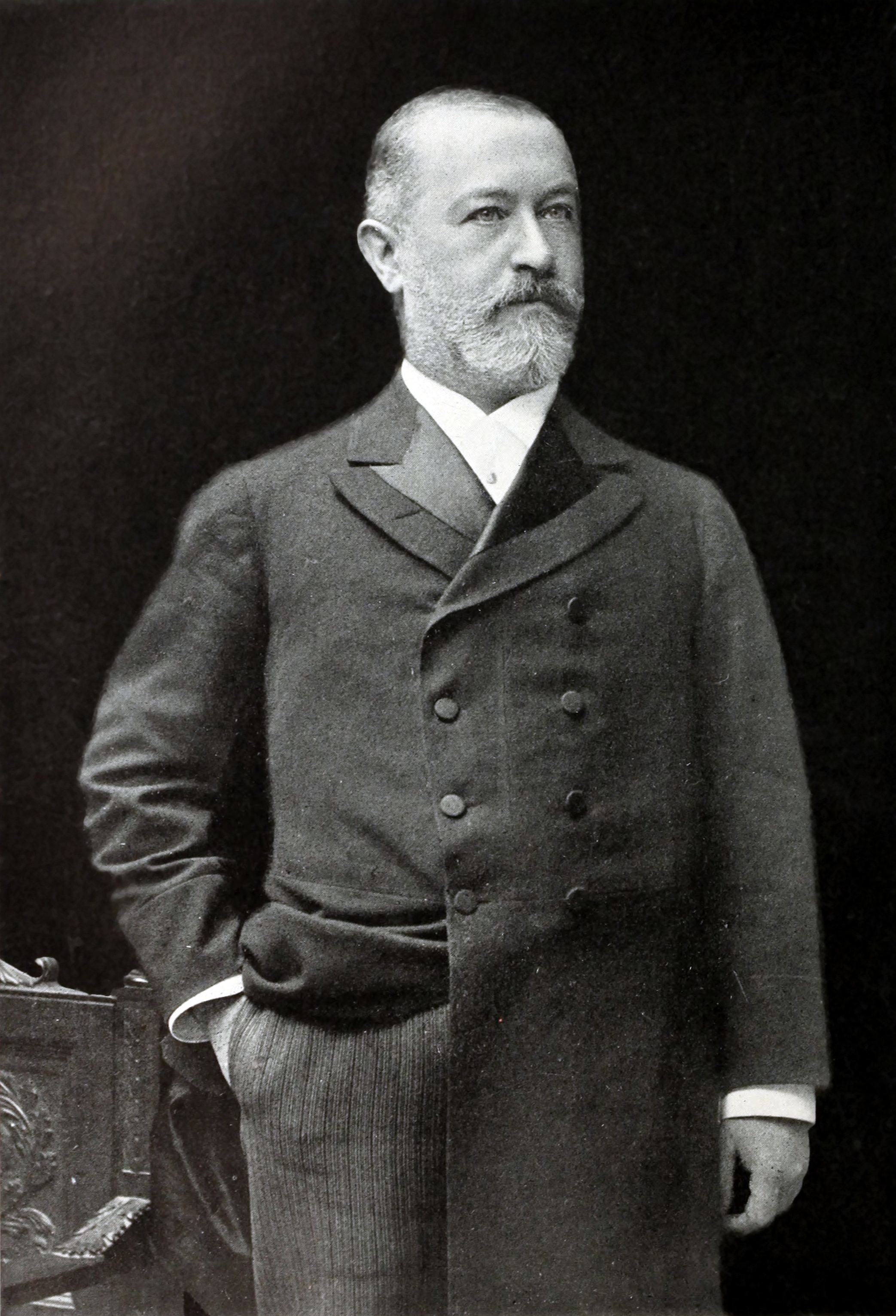
- Portrait by Aimé Dupont, 1903

Senior Partner, Kuhn, Loeb & Co.
- In office 1885 – September 25, 1920
- Succeeded by: Mortimer Leo Schiff

Personal details
- Born: Jakob Heinrich Schiff; January 10, 1847 Frankfurt, German Confederation
- Died: September 25, 1920 (aged 73) New York City, U.S.
- Citizenship: German (1847–1870); American (1870–1920)
- Spouse: Therese Loeb (m. 1875)
- Children: Frieda Schiff (1876–1958); Mortimer L. Schiff (1877–1931)
- Occupation: Banker and businessman

Jacob Henry Schiff (born Jakob Heinrich Schiff; January 10, 1847 – September 25, 1920) was a Jewish German-born American banker, businessman, and philanthropist. He helped finance the expansion of American railroads, and the Japanese military efforts against Tsarist Russia in the Russo-Japanese War.

Born in Frankfurt, Germany, Schiff migrated to the United States after the American Civil War and joined the firm Kuhn, Loeb & Co. From his base on Wall Street, he was the foremost Jewish leader from 1880 to 1920 in what later became known as the "Schiff era", grappling with all major Jewish issues and problems of the day, including the plight of Russian Jews, American and international antisemitism, care of needy Jewish immigrants, and the rise of Zionism. He also became a director of many important corporations, including the National City Bank of New York, Equitable Life Assurance Society, Wells Fargo & Company, and the Union Pacific Railroad. In many of his interests he was associated with E. H. Harriman.

== Early life and education ==
Schiff was born in 1847 in the Judengasse in Frankfurt am Main, Germany, to Moses and Clara (née Niederhofheim) Schiff, members of a distinguished Ashkenazi Jewish rabbinical family that traced its lineage in Frankfurt back to 1370. One ancestor, David Tevele Schiff, became lead rabbi in Great Britain, and from 1765 until his death was acting head of the London Synagogue. Meir Ben Jacob Schiff, another relative, had become renowned as a Talmudic scholar and commentator in the 14th century. Jacob's father, Moses Schiff, was a broker for the Rothschilds. Schiff was educated in the schools of Frankfurt, and was first employed in the banking and brokerage business as an apprentice in 1861.

After the American Civil War had ended in April 1865, Schiff came to the United States, arriving in New York City on August 6. He became a broker on November 21, 1866, and joined the firm of Budge, Schiff & Company in 1867. He became a naturalized citizen of the United States in September 1870. However, Schiff's modern biographer Cohen says this happened a year later.

Upon the dissolution of Budge, Schiff & Company in 1872, Schiff decided to return to Germany. In 1873, he became manager of the Hamburg branch of the London & Hanseatic Bank. He returned to Frankfurt, however, upon the death of his father later that year. In 1874, Abraham Kuhn of the banking firm of Kuhn, Loeb & Company invited him to return to New York City and enter the firm. Not long after joining the firm of Kuhn, Loeb & Co., Schiff was in essence running the business.

== Career ==
Along with H. B. Claflin, Marcellus Hartley, Robert L. Cutting, and Joseph Seligman, he was a founder of the Continental Bank of New York in August 1870.

=== Kuhn, Loeb & Company ===
Schiff accepted Kuhn's invitation in January 1875, bringing to Kuhn, Loeb & Company his connections with Sir Ernest Cassel of London, Robert Fleming of Dundee (later of London), and Edouard Noetzlin of the Banque de Paris et des Pays-Bas (Bank of Paris and the Netherlands or Paribas). On May 6, 1875, he married Therese Loeb, daughter of Solomon Loeb. The couple were the parents of a son, Mortimer L. Schiff and a daughter, Frieda.

In 1885, Schiff became head of Kuhn, Loeb & Company. Besides financing Eastern railroads such as the Pennsylvania and the Louisville & Nashville, he took part in the reorganization of the Baltimore and Ohio Railroad in 1896–99, and at various times aided the American Smelting & Refining Company (ASARCO), the Westinghouse Electric Company, and the Western Union Telegraph Company. Less fortunate was his share in the reorganization in 1902 of the Metropolitan Street Railway of New York.

He became associated with E. H. Harriman in notable contests with James J. Hill and J.P. Morgan & Company for control of several Western railroads. Schiff served as a director of the Equitable Life Assurance Society, National City Bank of New York, Central Trust Company, Western Union Telegraph Company, Union Pacific Railroad, and Bond & Mortgage Guarantee Company. He was elected a director of Wells Fargo & Company in September 1914 to succeed his brother-in-law, Paul Warburg, who had resigned to accept appointment to the original Federal Reserve Board.

=== National loans ===
What is perhaps Schiff's most famous financial action took place during the Russo-Japanese War (1904–1905). Schiff met with Takahashi Korekiyo, deputy governor of the Bank of Japan, in Paris in April 1904. Schiff agreed to extend loans to the Empire of Japan in the amount of $200 million (equivalent to $5.5 billion in 2025), through Kuhn, Loeb & Co. These loans were the first major flotation of Japanese bonds on Wall Street, and provided approximately half the funds needed for Japan's war effort. Schiff made this loan in part because he believed gold was not as important as national effort and desire to win a war and due to the apparent underdog status of Japan at the time: a European empire had not yet been defeated by a non-Western nation, in a modern, full-scale war. It is quite likely Schiff also saw this loan as a means of answering, on behalf of the Jewish people for the antisemitic actions of the Russian Empire, specifically the recent Kishinev pogrom in 1903.

This loan attracted worldwide attention, and had major consequences. Since their domestic economy was still developing, Japan's military was dependent on massive imports of munitions, purchases made possible by Schiff's loan. In 1905, Japan awarded Schiff the Order of the Sacred Treasure, and in 1907, the Order of the Rising Sun, Gold and Silver Star, the second highest of the eight classes of that Order. Schiff was the first foreigner to receive the Order in person from Emperor Meiji in the Imperial Palace. Schiff also had a private audience with King Edward VII of the United Kingdom in 1904.

In addition to his famous loan to Japan, Schiff financed loans to many other nations, including those that would come to comprise the Central Powers. During World War I, Schiff urged U.S. President Woodrow Wilson and other Allied statesmen to end the war as quickly as possible, even without an Allied victory. He feared for the lives of his family, back in Germany, but also for the future of his adopted land. He arranged loans to France and other nations for humanitarian purposes, and spoke out against submarine warfare.

Schiff forbade any of the funds from his loans from going to the Russian Empire, due to the Tsarist regime's oppression of the Jewish people. When the Tsar was overthrown in 1917, Schiff believed that the oppression of Russia's Jews would end and formally repealed the impediments within his firm against lending to Russia.

However, Schiff's stance changed again upon the Bolsheviks' seizure of power:

"Schiff's gripe against Russia had been its anti-Semitism. At home Schiff had never shown any sympathy for socialism, not even the milder Morris Hillquit variety. Schiff had declared victory for his purposes in Russia after the tsar was toppled in March 1917 and Alexander Kerensky, representing the new provisional government, had declared Jews to be equal citizens. In addition to repeated public statements of support, he used both his personal wealth and the resources of Kuhn Loeb to float large loans to Kerensky's regime. When Lenin and Trotsky seized power for themselves in November 1917, Schiff immediately rejected them, cut off further loans, started funding anti-Bolshevist groups, and even demanded that the Bolsheviks pay back some of the money he'd loaned Kerensky. Schiff also joined a British-backed effort to appeal to fellow Jews in Russia to continue the fight against Germany."

=== Charitable endeavors ===
Schiff believed in the Jewish charitable principle of Zedakah. Beginning in childhood he recalled "Kindness was the keynote of the household... It was made our duty to put one-tenth aside for charity according to the old Jewish tradition."

Schiff always felt strongly about his connection to the Jewish people, and demonstrated this through his philanthropy. He founded the Jewish Industrial Removal Office which relocated New York immigrant Jews to the Western United States. He also founded an additional point of immigrant entry to the U.S. through Galveston, Texas. He supported relief efforts for the victims of pogroms in Russia, and helped establish and develop Hebrew Union College, the Jewish Theological Seminary, the Jewish Division in the New York Public Library, and the American Jewish Committee.

Schiff grew to be one of American Jewry's top philanthropists and leaders, donating to nearly every major Jewish cause, New York examples being the Montefiore Home for Chronic Invalids, of which he was president, the Young Men's Hebrew Association building and the Jewish Theological Seminary.

He was also involved with many secular American causes: in addition to serving on the Board of Managers of the New York Zoological Society, he gave to such organizations as the Boy Scouts of America, the Harvard Semitic Museum, the American Museum of Natural History, Metropolitan Museum of Art, American Fine Arts Society, American Geographical Society, and Barnard College; and a number of other organizations for civil rights and the disadvantaged, such as the American Red Cross, the Visiting Nurse Service of New York and Henry Street Settlement (New York) and Tuskegee Institute.

Schiff was actively concerned with the improvement of civic conditions in New York City. He was a vice president of the New York Chamber of Commerce, and a member of the Committee of 70 which resulted in the overthrow of the Tweed Ring.

On his 70th birthday, he distributed $700,000 among various charitable organizations and public institutions.

Schiff believed in the Talmudic principle that "twice blessed is he who gives in secret." He did not permit his name to be attached to the buildings he sponsored, with the one exception of the Schiff Pavilion at his Montefiore Hospital, and never discussed the size of his gifts. Because of his secrecy, the exact amount of his philanthropic donations is impossible to calculate, but it has been estimated between $50 and $100 million.

=== World War I ===
The Action Française movement and its leader, Charles Maurras, claimed that Schiff was thoroughly pro-German and had worked to prevent American entry into World War I. Maurras went so far as to suggest that a telegram from Schiff and other prominent American Jewish leaders convinced President Wilson to give in to certain German arguments at the post-war peace negotiations, including allowing Upper Silesia to have a plebiscite rather than being ceded to Poland. The telegram is not known to have actually existed. Moreover, it has been argued that Schiff stopped financing transactions for Germany or the Central Powers as of 1914, stopped speaking German in public and was eager to demonstrate his moral and financial commitment to the Allied cause.

A practitioner of Reform Judaism, Schiff supported political, secular Zionism. Despite not agreeing fully with the ideas of Theodor Herzl, and in fact believing that Zionism would cause Americans to question his loyalty, he donated to many Jewish projects in Israel, including the Technical Institute of Haifa. As the situation for Eastern European Jews grew more dire, with the Russian Revolution and subsequent Russian Civil War, and pogroms in Ukraine, Schiff made more considerable contributions to the Zionist effort; he even offered to join the Zionist organization, provided he could publish a statement he'd prepared. This offer was denied, and so he never formally joined the Zionist camp.

Journalist George Kennan noted that Schiff helped finance revolutionary propaganda during the Russo-Japanese War and Revolution of 1905, through the Society of Friends of Russian Freedom. The Jewish Communal Register of New York City stated that, "Mr. Schiff has always used his wealth and his influence in the best interests of his people. He financed the enemies of autocratic Russia and used his financial influence to keep Russia from the money markets of the United States."

== Death ==
Schiff died at his Fifth Avenue home in Manhattan, New York City on September 25, 1920. His funeral was held three days later at Temple Emanu-El, then located at 43rd Street and Fifth Avenue in Manhattan.

His estate was estimated at about $50,000,000 (approximately $804,000,000 today). He bequeathed $1,350,000 to various institutions, most of which had received benefactions during his life. The largest bequests were $500,000 to the Federation for the support of Jewish Philanthropic Societies of New York City and $300,000 to the Montefiore Home.

== Legacy ==
He was succeeded as head of Kuhn, Loeb & Company by his son, Mortimer Leo Schiff.

Schiff was inducted into the Junior Achievement U.S. Business Hall of Fame in 1982.

The Jacob Schiff Center, named after him, was a prominent Jewish cultural center and synagogue from the 1930s through at least the 1960s. It was located on Valentine Avenue, near the intersection of Fordham Road and the Grand Concourse in the Fordham section of The Bronx.

New York City public school number 192 in West Harlem is also named for him. It serves grades pre-K through 5th grade.

In Germany, there was an attempt to name a street Jacob-Schiff-Straße in Frankfurt in response to the numerous charitable donations he had made to the city. When the Nazi Party took power in 1933, the street's name was changed to Mummstraße after Daniel Heinrich Mumm von Schwarzenstein, the city's former mayor, as part of aryanization.

== Family ==
- Wife: Therese (née Loeb)
- Children: Mortimer Schiff; Frieda Warburg, née Schiff.
- Father: Moses Schiff
- Mother: Clara Schiff, née Niederhofheim
- Granddaughter: Dorothy Schiff
- Grandson: John M. Schiff
- Grandson: Henry Schiff
- Great Grandson: David T. Schiff
- Great-Great-Grandson: Hubert Jacob Henry Schiff
- Son-in-Law: Felix Warburg
- Brother-in-Law: Paul Warburg

David T. Schiff's son Andrew Neman Schiff was married previously to former Vice President Al Gore's daughter, Karenna. Together they had three children, before divorcing in 2010.
