= Broad Exchange Building =

Residential building in Manhattan, New York

- U.S. National Register of Historic Places
- U.S. Historic district – Contributing property
- New York State Register of Historic Places
- New York City Landmark
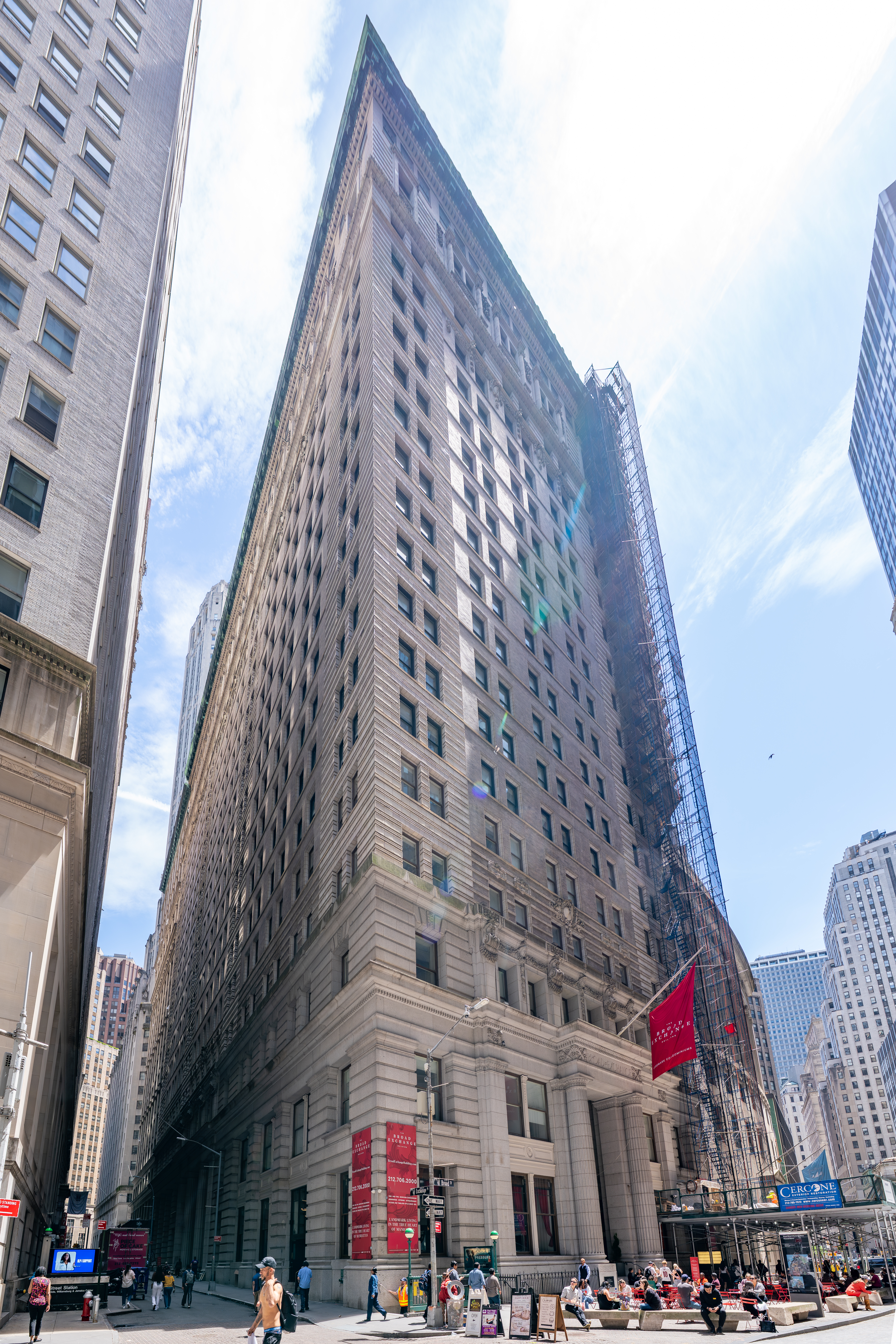
- Broad Street facade (2026)
- Location: 25 Broad Street, New York City
- Coordinates: 40°42′21″N 74°00′41″W
- Built: 1900–1902
- Architect: Clinton & Russell
- Architectural style: Renaissance
- Part of: Wall Street Historic District (ID07000063)
- NRHP reference No.: 98000366
- NYSRHP No.: 06101.008511
- NYCL No.: 2074

Significant dates
- Added to NRHP: April 13, 1998
- Designated CP: February 20, 2007
- Designated NYSRHP: March 3, 1998
- Designated NYCL: June 27, 2000

The Broad Exchange Building, also known as 25 Broad Street, is a residential building at Exchange Place and Broad Street in the Financial District of Lower Manhattan in New York City. The 20-story building was designed by Clinton & Russell and built between 1900 and 1902. The Alliance Realty Company developed the Broad Exchange Building as a speculative development for office tenants.

The Broad Exchange Building is either 20 or 21 stories tall. Its articulation consists of three horizontal sections similar to the components of a column, namely a base, shaft, and capital. The lowest three stories of the facade are clad with rusticated granite blocks; the fourteen-story shaft is clad with brick; and the top stories are clad with granite and terracotta, topped by a copper cornice. Inside, the building originally contained office space, but as of 2019, has 307 residential units. With 326,500 square feet (30,330 m^{2}) of rental space in total, the Broad Exchange Building was Manhattan's largest office building upon its completion.

Due to the Broad Exchange Building's proximity to the New York Stock Exchange Building, many financial firms sought space in the building. The Broad Exchange Building was sold off numerous times in the late 20th and early 21st centuries. The Broad Exchange Building was gutted and renovated into apartments in the late 1990s, and a southern wing of the building was demolished in the early 21st century. The building was added to the National Register of Historic Places (NRHP) in 1998, and was designated a city landmark by the New York City Landmarks Preservation Commission in 2000. It is also a contributing property to the Wall Street Historic District, a NRHP district created in 2007.

== Site ==
The Broad Exchange Building is located in the Financial District of Manhattan, at the southeast corner of Broad Street and Exchange Place. The block on which the building is located is bounded by Broad Street to the west, Exchange Place to the north, William Street to the east, and Beaver Street to the south. The Broad Exchange Building has 106.8 feet (32.6 m) of frontage on Broad Street and 296.3 feet (90.3 m) on Exchange Place. (Note: Architectural writers Sarah Landau and Carl Condit cite a figure of 236 feet (72 m) on Exchange Place.)

As designed, the building was shaped in an irregular "T" with a wing going southward toward Beaver Street. According to a 1909 advertisement, the building originally occupied around 28,705 square feet (2,666.8 m^{2}) of space. The southern wing was demolished in the early 2010s.

The building is adjacent to 15 Broad Street to the north; the New York Stock Exchange Building to the northwest; the Continental Bank Building to the west; and the Lee, Higginson & Company Bank Building and 45 Broad Street to the south. In addition, 55 Wall Street and 20 Exchange Place are less than one block east, and Federal Hall and 23 Wall Street are one block north. Historically, the Broad Exchange Building also abutted the Corn Exchange Bank at William and Beaver Streets, a site later taken up by 15 William Street. Flanking the main building entrance on Broad Street are two staircase entrances for the Broad Street station on the New York City Subway's Nassau Street Line (served by the J and Z trains).

== Architecture ==
The building was designed by Clinton and Russell in the Italian Renaissance Revival style. It is 276.55 feet (84 m) tall. Sources differ on whether the building has 20 or 21 stories.

=== Facade ===
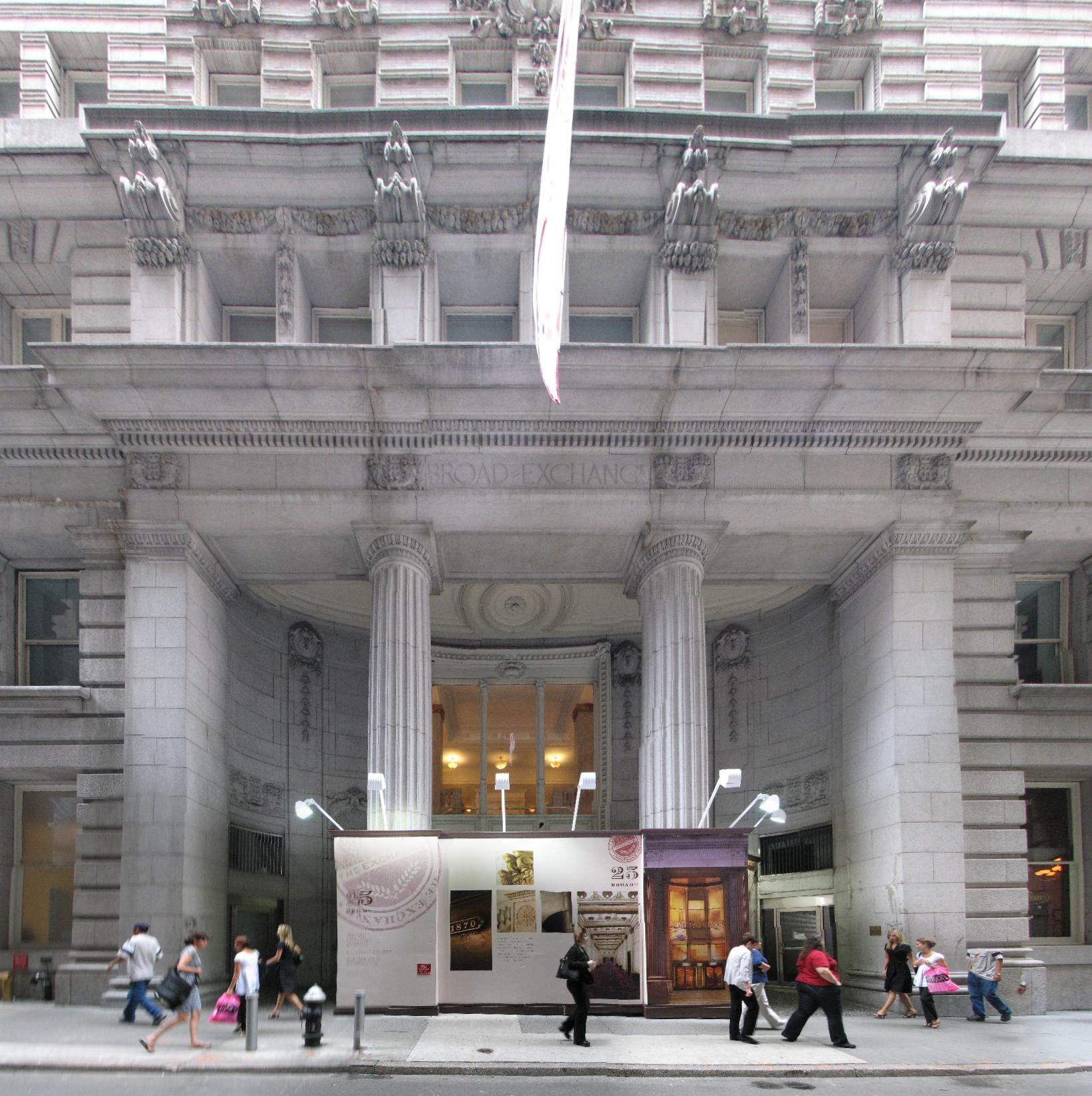
Side entrance on Exchange Place

The primary elevation on Broad Street contains 10 vertical bays, while the Exchange Place elevation has 26 bays. The Broad Exchange Building's articulation consists of three horizontal sections similar to the components of a column, namely a base, shaft, and capital. The lowest three stories of the facade are clad with rusticated granite blocks. The fourteen-story shaft is generally clad with brick and contains terracotta trim. The highest three stories contain a facade of granite and terracotta, topped by a copper cornice.

At ground level, there is an entrance portico projecting slightly from the center of the Broad Street elevation, measuring two bays wide and two stories high. The portico consists of fluted Doric columns supporting an entablature with the text broad exchange, underneath which is a cast-iron aedicule containing the main doors. On either side of the portico are two stories of paired sash windows flanked by granite pilasters, with cast-iron vertical mullions and decorated cast-iron horizontal spandrels. The six center bays at the 3rd story are topped by an alternating series of four granite modillions and three heads depicting Greek figures. The secondary entrance on Exchange Place is similar to that on Broad Street, except that this entrance is six bays wide, has no projecting portico, and contains wall niches containing bronze lamps. There are two tertiary entrances along Exchange Place as well. A frieze runs above the second floor, and a granite string course runs above the 3rd floor.

The 4th through 17th stories are clad with brick, except for the two outermost bays on either end of the Exchange Place and Broad Street elevations, which are instead clad with rusticated terracotta. In the six center bays on the Exchange Place and Broad Street elevations, there are elaborate cartouches between the 4th and 5th floors, and two cartouches and three lions' heads between the 16th and 17th stories. A terracotta string course runs above the 17th story. These elevations contain one rectangular window opening in each bay. The 18th through 20th stories comprise the attic; the two outermost bays on either end of the Exchange Place and Broad Street elevations are clad with rusticated terracotta. On the 18th and 19th story along Exchange Place, three of the pairs of bays are flanked by a pair of Ionic columns. A copper cornice runs above the 20th story. A penthouse, sometimes considered the 21st story, is atop the roof.

The rear elevations are composed mostly of brick, as was the now-demolished south wing, and contain arched and rectangular window openings. The east elevation contained cornices above the 16th and 20th floors. The south wing was topped by a decorative cartouche similar to those on the Exchange Place and Broad Street elevations.

=== Features ===
The Broad Exchange Building uses caisson foundations that descend 40 feet (12 m) to the bedrock layer, supporting the building's mass. The frame was made of structural steel, enabling it to be built taller than most previous buildings. There is a basement and subbasement with mechanical rooms, as well as large vaults.

When built, the Broad Exchange Building was described as "a town under a single roof", with fourteen or eighteen elevators. It had 490,000 square feet (46,000 m^{2}) of space in total and 326,500 square feet (30,330 m^{2}) of rentable space, corresponding to 27,000 square feet (2,500 m^{2}) on each floor. In the original configuration there were 40 offices per floor, but the floors were arranged in an open plan layout. The lowest four floors were targeted toward bankers and banking firms, with 15-foot (4.6 m) ceilings.

Since residential conversion, the building has had 307 residential condominium units. These consist of 168 one-bedroom units, 135 two-bedroom units, and four penthouse apartments. Each condominium has ceilings measuring 9 to 13.5 feet (2.7 to 4.1 m) high, wooden floors, and glass bathroom tiles. In addition, the units have appliances such as washer-dryers, while the penthouses have outdoor terraces of between 410 and 3,000 square feet (38 and 279 m^{2}). The building's amenities include a shared lounge for residents; a room for games and simulations; indoor and outdoor play areas for children; a dog grooming salon; and a shared rooftop terrace. After its conversion, the building has had five elevators.

The lobby measures 125 feet (38 m) long and is shaped in a "T". The longer leg of the "T" extends west–east from Broad Street, while a shorter north–south passageway extends from Exchange Place and intersects with the west–east corridor. Two classical staircases flank the corridor leading from Exchange Place and lead to a mezzanine. The walls in the lobby are clad with marble, and contain marble pilasters topped by Corinthian capitals. On the lobby's eastern wall are the five remaining elevators, with stainless steel doors. The lobby's ceiling is made of plaster beams with overhanging lighting fixtures. Four commercial spaces abut the lobby. After rental conversion in the 1990s, the lobby was used as a leasing office by its first owner Crescent Heights; Swig Equities converted it into a party space during the 2000s, and LCOR converted it into a lounge in the 2010s.

== History ==
=== Construction ===
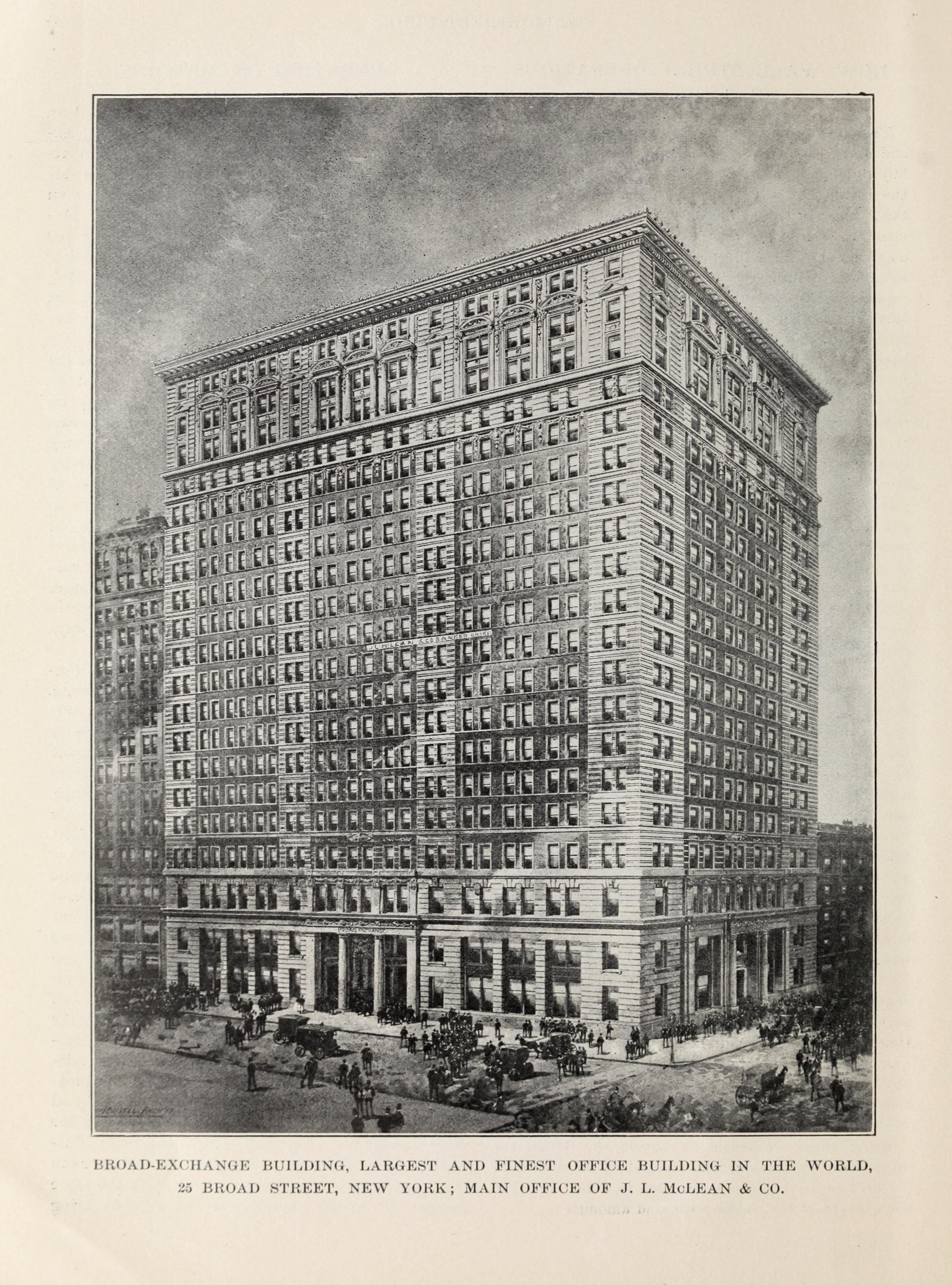
Depicted in 1902

During the late 19th century, builders began erecting tall office buildings in New York City, especially in Lower Manhattan, where they were compelled to build tall structures due to a lack of available land. One such project was headed by the Alliance Realty Company, who hired Clinton & Russell in 1900 to design a speculative development at 25 Broad Street, near Exchange Place. The George A. Fuller Company was hired as the contractor. The structural steelwork was designed by civil engineer Marion S. Parker. In June 1900, Alliance Realty transferred ownership to the Broad Exchange Company, in which Fuller was involved, for $4 million. The Broad Exchange Company then secured a $2.25 million construction loan from the Equitable Life Assurance Society.

Contemporary media reported that the building was occupied by late April or early May 1901. The building was officially completed in 1902, and was Manhattan's largest office building, with 326,500 square feet (30,330 m^{2}) of space available for rent. The next largest buildings in Manhattan were the Bowling Green Offices Building, Equitable Life Building, and 42 Broadway, which each only had two-thirds of the space that the Broad Exchange Building had. The Architectural Record observed contemporaneously that New York City buildings like the Broad Exchange Building were increasingly being erected by holding companies "organized to 'finance' such big undertakings" rather than their owners.

=== Office use ===
Financial firms began moving into the Broad Exchange Building, attracted by its proximity to the New York Stock Exchange. The building provided office space for financial companies such as Paine Webber, who occupied the space starting in 1909, and Hayden, Stone & Co., which moved in during 1906. The New York Curb Exchange took space in the Broad Exchange Building in 1911, and remained there until the Curb Exchange Building opened in 1921. The Pierce Oil Corporation's offices in the building were described by The New York Times as being "among the most handsome in the financial district". Other tenants included brokers Carl H. Pforzheimer and Company, as well as investment bankers Stephen Trask and Company. In addition, the City Midday Club was housed on the building's 20th floor from 1901 to 1945.

When the Broad Exchange Building was built, there existed a public alleyway called Lord's Court east of the building's southern wing, which connected to a six-story building at 53 Beaver Street. The owner of 53 Beaver Street sued Broad Exchange Company in 1905 after the company delivered coal and hauled out ashes to Beaver Street, and the company was subsequently found to have no right to use the alleyway. The Broad Exchange Company then bought a four-story building at 41 Broad Street for $325,000 (equivalent to $11,645,833 in 2025) so it could transport the coal and ashes through 41 Broad Street, and then leased out the upper floors of that building. The Broad Exchange Building and 41 Broad Street were remortgaged in 1909 for $3.45 million. Three years later, the Broad Exchange Company announced plans to demolish 41 Broad Street, described in the New-York Tribune as "one of the most expensive coal chutes in this country", and erect an annex to the Broad Exchange Building in its place. In 1921, the Broad Exchange Company bought 53 Beaver Street, providing an alternate entrance to the Broad Exchange Building. Broad Exchange and Alliance Realty acquired all of the Broad Street blockfront by 1922, although not all of these lots would become part of the Broad Exchange Building.

25 Broad Street was owned by the Broad Exchange Company until 1940, when Prudential Financial took over the building for $500,000 as part of foreclosure proceedings against the Broad Exchange Company. At the time, the property was assessed as being worth $5.6 million. During the mid-1940s, the building remained nearly 100% occupied, and one of the major lessees was the United States Department of War. 25 Broad Street was purchased by the City Investing Company in 1945, at which point its worth was assessed at $4.85 million. Walker & Gillette renovated the storefronts shortly afterward, adding two entrances on Exchange Place. Harry Helmsley bought the building in 1952 for $6.5 million. Several major tenants moved out during the late 20th century. Hayden, Stone & Co. moved out during 1970; Paine Webber & Co. moved its headquarters elsewhere in 1979, though some of the company's operations remained in 25 Broad Street through at least 1983.

In 1979, the Morgan Guaranty Trust Company bought 25 Broad Street and the adjacent 27 William Street for $20 million. The building was still 75% occupied at the time. Morgan planned to replace 25 Broad Street with a new office tower to serve as its headquarters, but put it for sale in 1981 after failing to do so. Olympia and York subsequently bought 25 Broad Street for $20.5 million, also planning to build an office tower, and also failing. In 1984, Joseph Neumann bought the building for $73 million in cash, assuming $58 million of the previous owners' debt, with the intention to build a headquarters for Kidder, Peabody & Co. on the site. Neumann's consortium spent $18 million to restore the building for office use until it ran out of money. After the 1987 stock market crash, Neumann locked up 25 Broad Street in 1988, and the building sat empty for the next four years, during which it was looted. Neumann defaulted on the $58 million loan in 1989. The mortgage-holder, American Savings and Loan Association went out of business, and Federal Savings and Loan Insurance Corporation assumed the mortgage, while a consortium headed by Robert Bass assumed property management duties.

=== Residential use ===
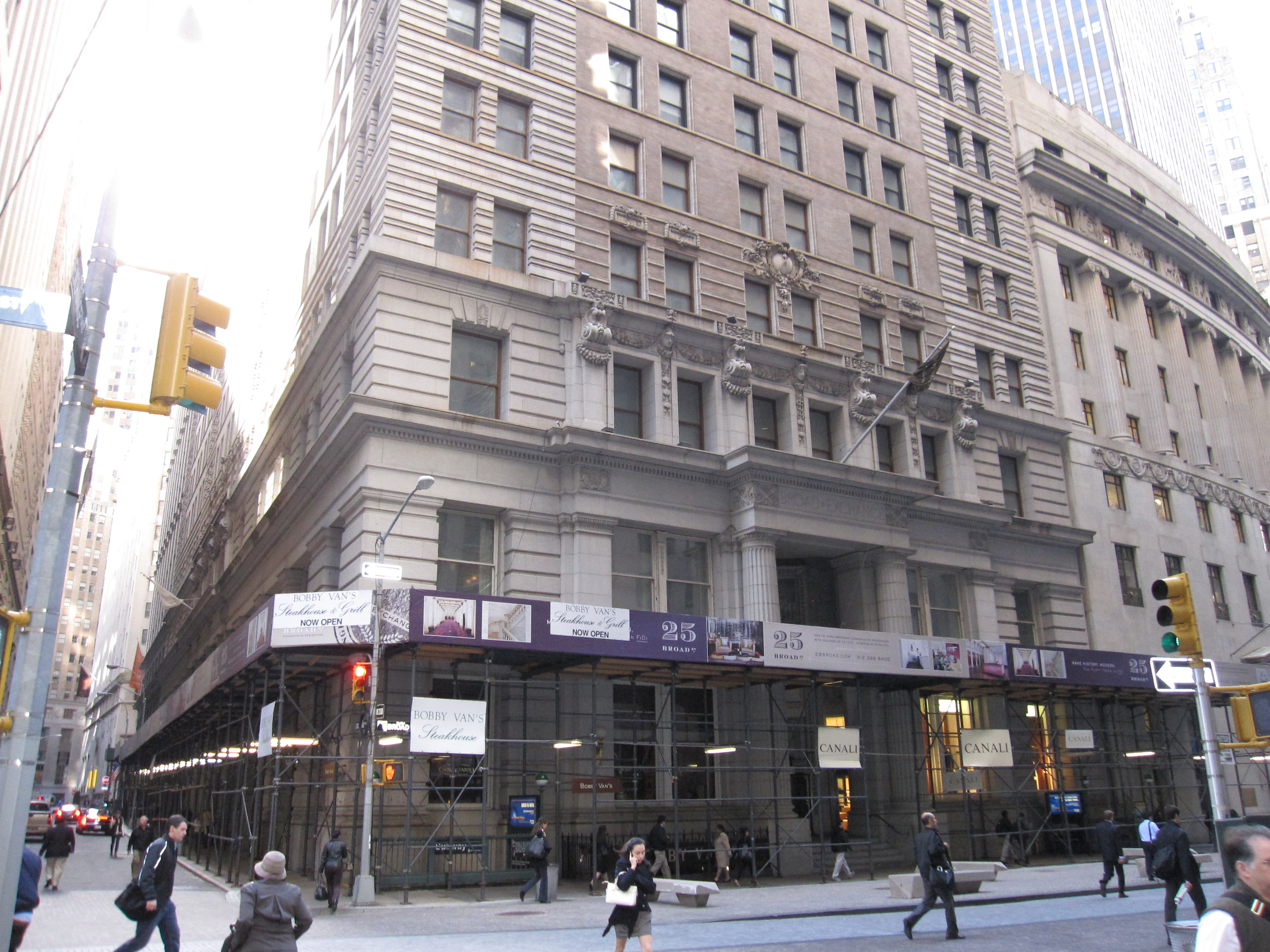
Seen at ground level

New West placed 25 Broad Street for sale in 1992, and the next year, Arthur Shapolsky signed a contract to buy the building for $5.8 million. Shapolsky wished to convert the building to either apartments or record storage. Abe Hirschfeld and Bruce Menin bought 25 Broad Street in 1994 for $4.975 million, a price that The Wall Street Journal noted at the time as being cheaper than that of some Manhattan townhouses. Menin's firm Crescent Heights then began converting the building into 345 luxury apartments. Costas Kondylis, as well as John Cetra of CetraRuddy, devised a plan to renovate 25 Broad Street, in one of the first major commercial-to-residential conversion projects in Lower Manhattan. The original interior was completely removed for the project. The conversion was originally supposed to be completed in 1996, although a rental office opened in 1997 and the project was ultimately finished the next year. In total, the conversion had cost $100 million.

Around the same time that the conversion was completed, city officials were considering a plan to purchase and raze the entire block upon which 25 Broad Street was located, erecting a new New York Stock Exchange building on the site. In 1998, Crescent Heights petitioned the New York City Landmarks Preservation Commission (LPC) to designate 25 Broad Street as a landmark to preclude such development. The building was added to the National Register of Historic Places (NRHP) on April 13, 1998. The LPC designated the building as a city landmark on June 27, 2000, and the New York City Council affirmed the designation that October. In 2007, it was designated as a contributing property to the Wall Street Historic District, a NRHP district.

About fifty tenants left the building after the September 11 attacks on the nearby World Trade Center in 2001, though these vacancies were quickly filled as part of a grant program to encourage people to live in Lower Manhattan. Crescent Heights put 25 Broad Street for sale in 2005, and Swig Equities purchased it for $260 million, planning to convert the building into a rental complex. Swig subsequently indicated plans to de-designate part of the building as a landmark, because it wished to demolish the southern wing above the first floor, transferring the air rights to its new residential skyscraper at 45 Broad Street. The local community board, Manhattan Community Board 1, endorsed the decertification. Under Swig's management, 25 Broad Street became known as the Exchange, and condominium sales launched in early 2007. Lehman Brothers Holdings made a mortgage on the building in 2007, but when Swig fell into default due to the 2008 financial crisis, Lehman initiated foreclosure proceedings in January 2009. Lehman Brothers itself filed for bankruptcy in 2008, prompting Swig to close the sales office for the condos at 25 Broad Street. A court-appointed receiver designated LCOR, a subsidiary of the California State Teachers Retirement System, as the new developer for the rental project, and Lehman spent $39.9 million on preparing the building for conversion. In March 2011, Lehman sought permission from the judge overseeing its bankruptcy proceedings to restart work on the conversion, as well as demolish the south wing. The building's leasing office opened the next month. 25 Broad Street was auctioned in 2012 as part of the foreclosure proceeding against Swig, and LCOR made the winning bid of $170 million.

After receiving approval from the LPC, LCOR spent another $50 million to renovate 25 Broad Street in 2013, demolishing the south wing and restoring the exterior to its early-20th-century appearance. The residential units were largely converted to luxury rentals and were mostly occupied by September 2013. However, the building had previously received a 421-g tax exemption, meant for developers converting Lower Manhattan buildings to residential use, and as such, some of the residential units were rent-stabilized. A judge ruled in 2015 that two rental tenants could stay in their rent-stabilized apartment, since they had not been given proper notice that the exemption for their unit was expiring. Most of the remaining units in 25 Broad Street were converted into condominium units, with sales launching in 2019. Booking.com ran a promotion at the building in January 2020, allowing people to stay in several of the unsold units for two nights. The same month, Regal Acquisitions bought the building's ground level storefronts. In July 2020, the developers announced that 15% of the condominium units were under contract, despite a general slowdown in real estate market due to the COVID-19 pandemic in New York City. Ultimately, three-fourths of the units were sold by 2021. Reuveni Development Marketing became the building's real estate broker in late 2023.

== See also ==
- Early skyscrapers
- List of New York City Designated Landmarks in Manhattan below 14th Street
- National Register of Historic Places listings in Manhattan below 14th Street
