= Jesse Seligman =

Jesse Seligman (August 11, 1827 – April 23, 1894) was a German-born Jewish-American banker and philanthropist.

== Life ==
Seligman was born on August 11, 1827, in Baiersdorf, Kingdom of Bavaria, the son of David Seligman and Fanny Steinhardt. Joseph Seligman was his brother.

In 1841, while Seligman was still attending the local Gymnasium, he joined his older brothers in America. Shortly after arriving, he went to the South with some of his brothers to do business in Selma, Alabama, along with some other smaller towns. In 1848, he left to open a store in Watertown, New York, where he made the acquaintance of then-Lieutenant Ulysses S. Grant. In 1850, during the height of the California Gold Rush, he and his brother Leopold moved to San Francisco, California. They came to San Francisco with a supply of merchandise and established a store at the only brick building there at the time, meaning the store survived the San Francisco Fire of 1851. He then became an active member of the San Francisco Vigilance Committee and the San Francisco Committee of Twenty-one.

In 1857, Seligman moved to New York City and was active in the clothing business with his brothers. During the American Civil War, they established the banking-house J. & W. Seligman & Co., which proved so successful they dropped the clothing business to devote themselves to finance. The firm proved successful and opened branches all over the world, with different brothers in charge of different branches. Jesse was put in charge of the firm in 1880, after his elder brother Joseph died. A trusted advisor to multiple Secretaries of the Treasury, he helped keep the firm unharmed by the Black Friday panic. He was also involved in major commercial enterprises that required large capital investment, including early attempts to build the Panama Canal and railroads in the American Southwest.

Seligman helped organize the Hebrew Orphan Asylum of New York in 1859 and served as its president before his death. He was one of the original board members of the Baron de Hirsch Fund. A prominent member of the Republican Party, he twice refused to be nominated as their candidate for Mayor of New York City. He served as vice-president of the Union League Club until 1893, when he resigned after the club refused to admit his son Theodore as a member because of antisemitism. He was also a director of the New York Association for Improving the Condition of the Poor, a trustee of the Metropolitan Museum of Art and the American Museum of Natural History, and a prominent member of Congregation Emanu-El.

In 1854, Seligman married Henriette Hellman (1836-1909). Their children were Theodore David (1856-1907), Henry (1857-), Albert Joseph (1859-), Alice Frances (1860-1904), Emma (1864-1908), Florine (1866-1870), and Madeline (1871-).

In 1894, Seligman's health was declining and he took a private rail to California. On the way, he took his first and only visit to Seligman, Arizona, which was named after him. He died in Coronado Beach, California, on April 23, 1894. His body was shipped back to New York City and his funeral was held in Temple Emanu-El, with representatives from various organizations he was associated with attending along with 150 children from the Orphan Asylum. Rabbis Joseph Silverman and Gustav Gottheil spoke at the funeral service. He was buried at Salem Fields Cemetery.
