= NEMA (Boston) =

Residential tower in Boston, MA, US

Coordinates: 42.349080°N 71.044715°W

The Metlo Boston
- Interactive map of the The Metlo Boston area
- Alternative names: 399 Congress

General information
- Status: Completed
- Type: Residential
- Location: 399 Congress Street; Boston, Massachusetts
- Construction started: 2017
- Completed: 2019
- Cost: US$200 million
- Operator: Greystar

Height
- Roof: 274 feet (83.5 m)

Technical details
- Floor count: 22

Design and construction
- Architects: Stantec and Group One Partners
- Developer: Crescent Heights

Other information
- Number of units: 414
- Parking: 144

The Metlo Boston (also 399 Congress Street) is a tower in the Seaport area of Boston, Massachusetts. The 22-story mixed-use tower is located adjacent to East Service Road, Congress Street and Boston Wharf Road.

The tower has 414 apartment residences, and approximately 2,550 square feet of ground-floor retail. The tower ises 274 feet (83.51 m) when complete in Fall 2019. It is designed by Stantec and Group One Partners.

Amenities include a rooftop terrace with outdoor theater and a heated pool; private movie theater; game room; shared co-working space; fitness center; yoga studio; spa treatment rooms; and a resident lounge.

== History ==
Boston-based Madison Properties originally purchased the development site from Boston Edison Co. in 2006 for $5.65 million. The Boston Planning and Development Agency, approved a mixed-use development plan in July 2013. In 2016, Crescent Heights purchased the parcel and the approved plan for 414 apartments for $36 million. A construction permit was filed with the city on July 7, 2017.

The project was completed in December 2019.

== Design and amenities ==
The building has a façade of orange and yellow bricks balanced with green glass and an exterior 70-foot LED art wall. Amenities include a rooftop terrace with outdoor theater and a heated pool; private movie theater; game room; shared co-working space; fitness center; yoga studio; spa treatment rooms; and a resident lounge.
