= Joseph Neumann =

Joseph Neumann (1648–1732) was a Jesuit missionary in colonial Mexico.

Neumann was born at Brussels in the Spanish Netherlands on 5 August 1648, and joined the Jesuits as a teenager. He was admitted to the Society on 24 September 1663 and sent to complete his education at Olomouc in Moravia. He went on to teach grammar, humanities and rhetoric at Jesuit schools in the Bohemian province, before being sent on the American mission. He left for the mission on 11 April 1678, and was stationed in Nueva Vizcaya, New Spain.

His Historia seditionum (Prague, 1730) provided a history of rebellions by the Tarahumara in the Sierra Madre Occidental, to some of which he had been a first-hand witness.

He died in Mexico on 1 May 1732.
