= Joseph Aub (rabbi) =

- Born: 4 December 1804; Baiersdorf, Bayreuth, Prussia
- Died: 22 May 1880 (aged 75); Berlin, Prussia, Germany

Joseph Aub (4 December 1804 – 22 May 1880) was a German rabbi. He held various rabbinical posts for fifty years, first in Bayreuth (1830–50), then in Mainz (1850–65), and, finally, in Berlin from 1865 until his death, where he succeeded Michael Sachs.

On December 4, 1852 Aub joined the rabbinate in Mainz. A little later his community split after the new synagogue and its organ had been inaugurated and a sermon in German language was held. Until 1865 Aub remained the rabbi of the liberal community in Mainz; the Orthodox community was led by Marcus Lehmann.

Aub was distinguished as one of the first Bavarian rabbis who delivered their sermons in German and published them later in pamphlet form. He was a partisan of the Reform movement, but without losing the historic ground of Judaism. He founded a weekly entitled Sinai in 1846, but this independent organ met with mediocre success only.

Among his writings on theological questions may be mentioned: "Betrachtungen und Widerlegungen," in two parts, 1839; "Biblisches Sprachbuch für den Vorbereitenden Unterricht in der Mosaischen Religion," 1868; "Grundlage zu einem Wissenschaftlichen Unterrichte in der Mosaischen Religion."

His cousin Hirsch Aub was rabbi in Munich.
