= Buttenwieser =

Buttenwieser is a surname. Notable people with the surname include:

- Benjamin Buttenwieser (1900–1991), American banker, philanthropist, and civic leader
- Helen Lehman Buttenwieser (1905–1989), American lawyer and philanthropist
- Joseph L. Buttenwieser (1865–1938), American lawyer, philanthropist, and civic leader
- Laemmlein Buttenwieser (1825–1901), German-born Talmudist and linguist
