= Harvey M. Krueger =

American lawyer

- Born: April 16, 1929; Hackensack, New Jersey, U.S.
- Died: April 23, 2017 (aged 88); Manhattan, New York, U.S.
- Education: Columbia University (BA, JD)
- Occupations: President and CEO of Kuhn, Loeb & Co. Vice Chairman of Lehman Brothers
- Children: Liz Krueger

Harvey Mark Krueger (April 16, 1929 – April 23, 2017) was an American investment banker, former CEO and President of Kuhn, Loeb & Co. known for being the first banker to bring Israel to the international capital markets and helped broker the merger between Kuhn, Loeb & Co. and Lehman Brothers in 1977. He also served as the vice chairman of Lehman Brothers and Barclays.

== Early life and education ==
Krueger was born on April 16, 1929, and raised in Hackensack, New Jersey, as the eldest son of Isador and Isabel Krueger. His grandparents were Yiddish-speaking immigrants from Eastern Europe. He graduated from Columbia College in 1951 and Columbia Law School in 1953.

== Career ==
After graduating from law school, he was with Cravath, Swaine and Moore, LLP until 1959. Then, he joined Kuhn, Loeb, & Co., where he became a partner in 1965, head of corporate finance in 1970, and Chief Executive Officer in 1976. During his tenure at Kuhn, Loeb, & Co., he founded the company's office in Israel in 1961. He also helped finance Israeli companies such as Teva Pharmaceutical Industries Ltd., today the world's largest generic drugmaker. The deal to underwrite Teva's in 1987 was, in his own words, "the first time any institutional investors had invested in Israel equity." In addition to opening the door to promising Israeli companies, he was also credited for bringing talented Israelis to work on Wall Street. According to Israeli businessman Kobi Alexander, founder and chairman of Comverse Technology, Krueger was the one who "paved the way on Wall Street for Israeli companies."

As president and chief executive officer of Kuhn Loeb & Co., Krueger helped pull off its 1977 merger with Lehman Brothers to create one of the world's largest securities firms. Krueger became a senior managing director and vice chairman of Lehman Brothers, serving on the firm's executive committee that witnessed the struggle between Lewis Glucksman and Peter G. Peterson over the control of the closely held firm in 1983. Following Lehman's bankruptcy in 2008, and subsequent acquisition by Barclays Plc, Krueger became a vice chairman of Barclays.

An active philanthropist, he was Chairman of the Board of Governors of both Hebrew University from 1983 to 1992 and Tel Aviv University from 2010 to 2012, and served as an officer of Beit Hatfutsot as well as chairman of the Peres Center for Peace. He also served as chairman of the board of Cooper Hewitt, Smithsonian Design Museum from 1996 to 2000.

== Personal life ==
Krueger was married to Constance Alexander Krueger. He is the father of four children. One of his children, Liz Krueger, is a current member of the New York State Senate, representing District 28 on the East Side of Manhattan.

On April 23, 2017, he died at his home in Manhattan at 88.
