= Liz Krueger =

American politician (born 1957)

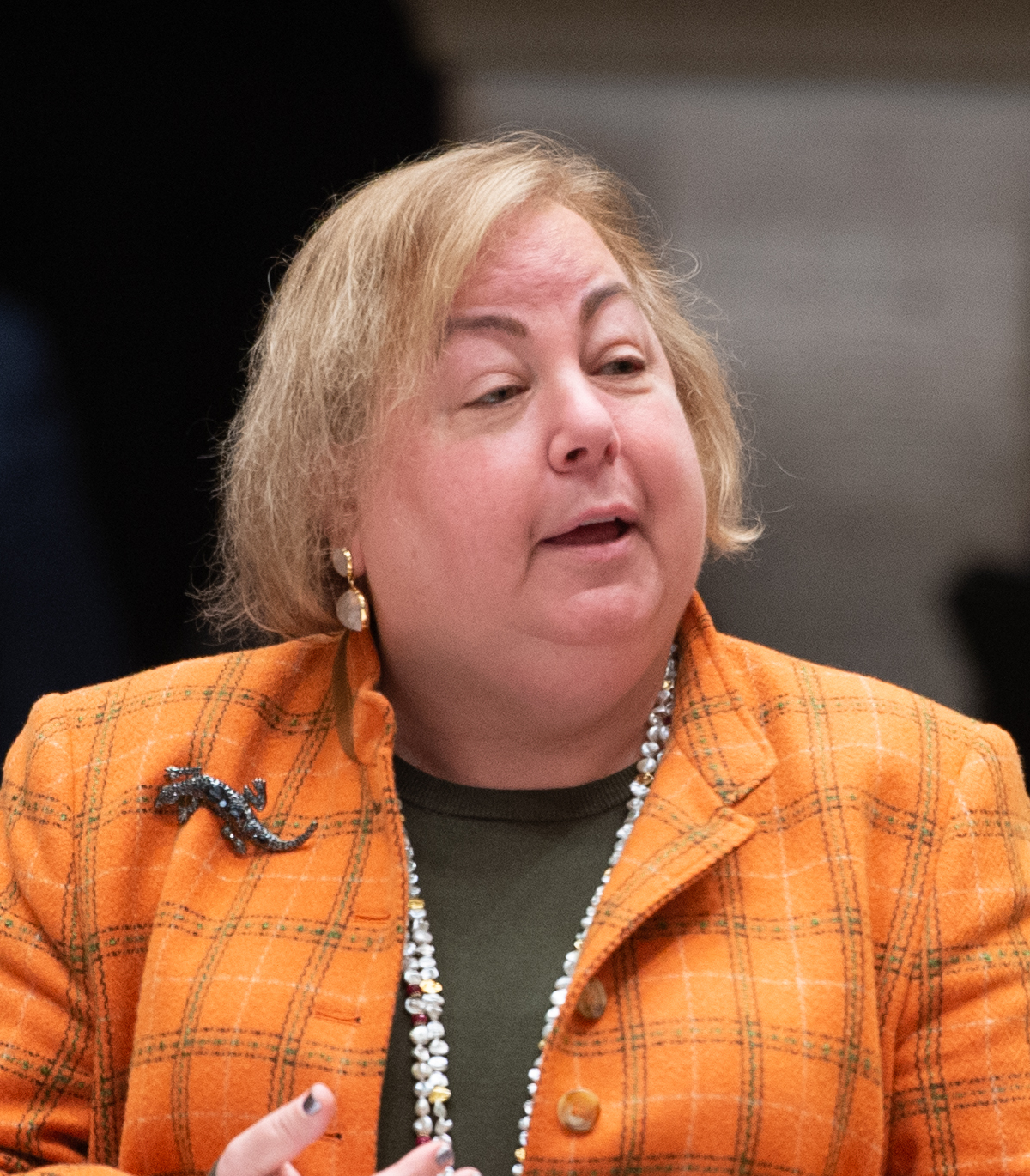

Member of the New York Senate from the 28th district
- Incumbent
- Assumed office February 13, 2002
- Preceded by: Roy M. Goodman
- Constituency: 26th district (2002–2012); 28th district (2013–present)

Personal details
- Born: November 20, 1957 (age 68) Ridgewood, New Jersey, U.S.
- Party: Democratic
- Spouse: John Seley
- Relatives: Harvey M. Krueger (father)
- Education: Northwestern University (BA); University of Chicago (MPP)
- Website: State Senate website

Elizabeth Krueger (born November 20, 1957) is an American politician. A Democrat, she represents District 28, consisting of the East Side of Manhattan, in the New York State Senate. She was first elected in a special election in 2002.

== Background ==
Krueger was born in Ridgewood, New Jersey to Harvey M. Krueger and Constance Krueger. She has two sisters. Her brother, Peter, died of AIDS in 1988. Her father was the CEO of the investment bank Kuhn, Loeb & Co., and served as vice chairman of Lehman Brothers following the merger with Kuhn, Loeb & Co. in 1977.

Krueger graduated from Ridgewood High School in 1975, earned a B.A. from Northwestern University in Social Policy and Human Development in 1979, and a master's degree from the University of Chicago's Harris School of Public Policy in 1981. Prior to elected office, Krueger was associate director of the Community Food Resource Center (CFRC) for 15 years, and she is the founding director of the New York City Food Bank. She is married to John E. Seley, a professor of urban planning and geography at The City University of New York Graduate Center and Princeton's Woodrow Wilson School of Public Affairs.

== New York Senate ==
Krueger initially ran for the state Senate in 2000, narrowly losing to Republican Senator Roy M. Goodman by less than a percentage point. Less than two years later, Goodman resigned and Krueger won the special election to replace him. Since then, she has never faced a challenging re-election. Many years later, The New York Times reported that months after the 2000 election that Krueger lost, hundreds of ballots from a pro-Krueger area were found in a Board of Elections air duct, although Krueger did not learn of this until just before the 2002 election that she won.

After the Democratic party took the majority in the 2018 elections, Krueger was elected the Chair of the Senate Finance Committee, one of the most powerful committees in the Senate. In 2021, Krueger was one of two members of the senate to vote against a bill designating baseball as the official state sport of New York.

Krueger is a member of the Vote Blue Coalition, a progressive group and federal PAC created to support Democrats in New York, New Jersey, and Pennsylvania through voter outreach and mobilization efforts. In late November 2024, Krueger made proposals to counter the incoming Trump administration encouraging New York and a bloc of liberal northeast states to join Canada. She explained her proposal to Politico, saying that she already made connections in Ottawa to effect Canadian support.
