= Harold Rosenwald =

American lawyer

- Born: July 23, 1907; Cambridge, Massachusetts, U.S.
- Died: March 9, 1990 (aged 82); Lexington, Massachusetts, U.S.
- Education: Harvard University; Harvard Law School
- Occupation: Lawyer
- Known for: Defense of Alger Hiss; Prosecution of Huey Long
- Spouse: Betty Booth (m. 1943)
- Children: 3

Harold Rosenwald (July 23, 1907 – March 9, 1990) was an American lawyer, best known for working on the defense team of Alger Hiss during 1949 and in the prosecution of Louisiana governor Huey Long.

== Background ==
Harold Rosenwald was born in Cambridge, Massachusetts. His sisters were Clare Rosenwald Schein (later an arbitrator for Family Court, died 1972), Leah Rosenwald Modest, and Charlotte Rosenwald Rosenberg.

He graduated from Cambridge Latin School (now Cambridge Rindge and Latin School) in 1923. He graduated cum laude from Harvard University in 1927. In 1930, he graduated from Harvard Law School, where he also served as editor of the Harvard Law Review (1928–1930) and class secretary. It was during this time he came to know Alger Hiss.

== Career ==
Rosenwald was admitted to the Massachusetts Bar in 1930 (and the U.S. Supreme Court Bar in 1936).

=== Government service ===
According to Whittaker Chambers, Rosenwald had worked in the U.S. Department of Justice during the 1930s under O. John Rogge:

He had worked for the U.S. Department of Justice, where he had been the assistant to O. John Rogge, an assistant to the Attorney General. The peculiar vehemence of Mr. Rogge's lefts views finally caused him [Rosenwald] to leave the Justice Department.

Rosenwald supported Justice in its case against U.S. General Charles G. Dawes to recover monies of the Reconstruction Finance Corporation (RFC) on a $90,000,000 "Dawes Loan." On May 15, 1936, Rosenwald filed a brief on behalf of John L. Hopkins, O. John Rogge, and others for the RFC. Later in May, Justice recovered $2,225,000 for RFC, for which Rosenwald received credit. Justice continued to pursue more repayment, and the case went to court in October 1938. He received credit for his efforts in November 1936 when a court ordered 3,500 Illinois stockholders of a defunct Central Republic Bank to pay $12,500,000 as part of repayment on that loan.

In 1939, Rosenwald again support Rogge, this time going after income tax cases in Louisiana related to Governor Huey Long's "Share Our Wealth" program. Rogge planned to move to the state due to the anticipated length of the case. He cited Rosenwald (and Albert B. Teton) as an expert whose presence he sought to join him because of Rosenwald's "experience in preparing income tax cases for trial."

=== Private practice ===
In April 1948, Rosenwald and John J. O'Niel were attorneys for a naval captain before the U.S. Supreme Court in "United States of America ex. rel. Harold E. Hirschberg v. Captain M. J. Malanaphy, United States Navy, Commanding Officer, United States Naval Receiving Station, Brooklyn, New York."

=== Hiss Case ===
During the Hiss Case, Rosenwald was an attorney first in 1948 with Oseas, Pepper & Segal and by 1950 with Beer, Richards, Lane and Haller (also known as Oseas, Pepper & Siegel with offices in Washington and on Liberty Street, New York) (from 1949 to 1957 called "Beer, Richards, Lane, Haller & Buttenwieser"). He was one of the chief lawyers in the Hiss Case who defended Alger Hiss, along with William L. Marbury, Jr. and Edward Cochrane McLean. He was the chief architect of argument for a "psychologically disturbed state of Whittaker Chambers."

On December 12, 1948, Rosenwald, "an associate of Edward C. McLean, Mr. Hiss' attorney," issued a statement by Hiss which said: "...I repeat the denial... I did not at any time deliver any official documents to Mr. Chambers or any unauthorized person."

While Lloyd Paul Stryker led during Hiss's first trial, Rosenberg's name remained among his legal defense. Again, when Claude B. Cross led during Hiss's second trial later in 1949, Rosenwald's name appears on his defense team along with McLean and Robert von Mehren.

=== Later years ===
By 1952, Rosenwald was "the legal representative to the Tito Government."

In 1958, Rosenwald represented Lovander Ladner in a Federal case against (in which Ladner was convicted for assaulting police officers).

In 1959–1960, Rosenwald represented defendants Goldfine and Paperman in an appeal case before the U.S. District Court with Judge Charles E. Wyzanski, Jr. presiding (in which Goldfine and Paperman lost).

In 1972, he represented Harvard student agencies in their pursuit of contraceptive sales at the university.

When Allen Weinstein's Perjury: The Hiss-Chambers Case came out in 1978, it quoted Rosenwald about the psychological argument:

The psychiatric theory has been criticized because it may be regarded as an unjustified smear of Chambers as a homosexual. Surely we intend to smear Chambers in any event. I have no objection to such smearing .... I see little difference between smearing Chambers as a homosexual and smearing him as a liar, a thief and a scoundrel.

In 1980, a review of John Lowenthal's documentary The Trials of Alger Hiss mentioned Rosenwald (along with Robert E. Stripling, Congressman F. Edward Hebert, the Rev. John F. Cronin, and journalist Ralph de Toledano) as among the "most informative" who helped counter "Lowenthal's own bias."

== Personal and death ==
In 1943, Rosenwald married Betty Booth. They had a son, Malcolm, a daughter Martha and son Stuart Harold. (Mrs. Rosenwald died in 2004.)

Rosenwald died age 82 of Parkinson's disease in Lexington, Massachusetts.

== See also ==
- O. John Rogge
- Alger Hiss
- Helen Lehman Buttenwieser
