= Mervin Kelly =

American physicist and businessman (1894–1971)

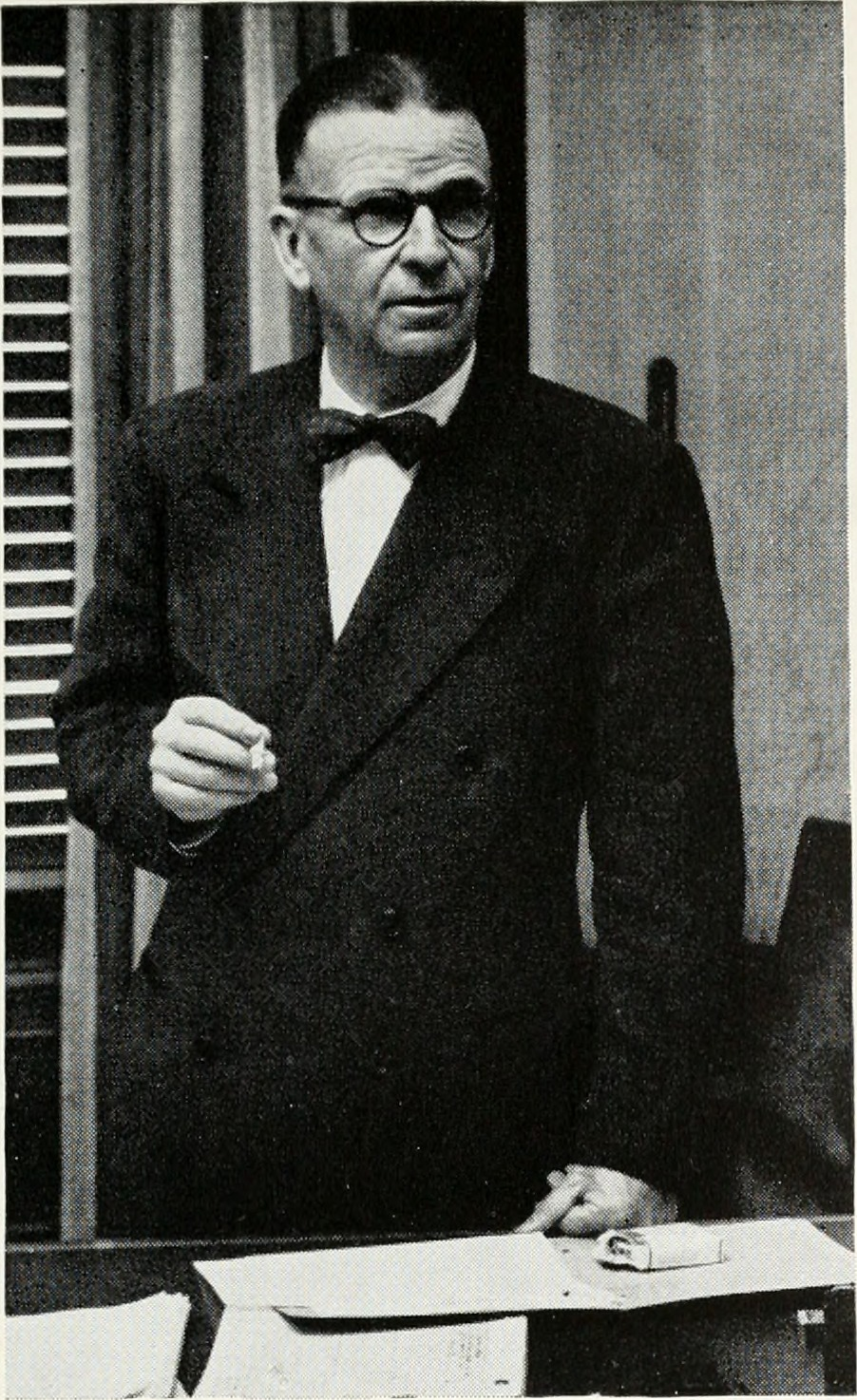
- Kelly as president of Bell Telephone Laboratories, 1956
- Born: Mervin Joseph Kelly; February 14, 1894; Princeton, Missouri, U.S.
- Died: March 18, 1971 (aged 77); Port St. Lucie, Florida, U.S.
- Education: Missouri School of Mines and Metallurgy (B.S.); University of Kentucky (M.S.); University of Chicago (Ph.D.)
- Spouse: Katherine Milsted (m. 1915)
- Children: 2
- Awards: IRI Medal (1954); John Fritz Medal (1959); Hoover Medal (1961)
- Scientific career
- Workplaces: Western Electric Company; Bell Telephone Laboratories
- Doctoral advisor: Robert Andrews Millikan

Signature
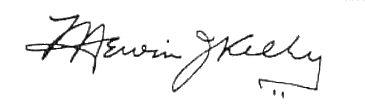

Mervin Joseph Kelly (February 14, 1894 – March 18, 1971) was an American industrial physicist. He worked at Bell Labs from 1925 to 1959 rising to director of research, then president and eventually chairman.

== Early life and education ==
Mervin Joseph Kelly was born in Princeton, Missouri, on February 14, 1894. His parents were Mary Etta (née Evans) and Joseph Fenimore Kelly. Mervin's great-great-grandfather had moved from Ireland to Virginia, while his mother's parents were Welsh.

At the time of Kelly's birth, his father was a high school principal. The family soon moved to Gallatin, Missouri, where Kelly's father started a hardware and farm implement business; his salary as a principal was insufficient to raise children. Kelly attended grade and high school in Gallatin, and graduated as class president and valedictorian at age 16. His classmates at Gallatin High School called him "our Irish king". During his school years, Kelly worked various jobs, such as delivering newspapers, driving cattle to pasture for local farmers, and serving as bookkeeper for his father's store. By the time he graduated high school, he had saved enough money for tuition at the Missouri School of Mines and Metallurgy (now, Missouri University of Science and Technology) in Rolla, Missouri; Kelly's family were unable to afford to send him. He later said: "I was really pretty lucky to go to Rolla. In those days, not too many youngsters got to go to college." To support himself, Kelly worked for the Missouri Geological Survey, which allowed him to board in a room above its headquarters. He earned $18 (equivalent to $622 in 2025) a month cataloging and numbering mineral specimens by working nights and weekends.

Kelly excelled as a student, particularly in chemistry and physics. He had planned to become a mining engineer, and spent a summer working in a Utah copper mine. This experience changed his desired career path, and he switched to a general science course upon his return to the Missouri School of Mines and Metallurgy. The heads of the chemistry and mathematics departments volunteered to give him special instruction, and he was appointed as an assistant in chemistry, for which he received free tuition and an annual grant of $300 (equivalent to $10,009 in 2025). When he graduated in 1914 with a B.S. degree, Kelly decided that he wanted "to make a life in academic research." He taught physics and studied mathematics at the University of Kentucky, receiving his master's degree in 1915. He then went on to the University of Chicago, where he received his Ph.D. in physics in 1918. During his time at Chicago, Kelly was an assistant to Professor Robert Andrews Millikan, who won the Nobel Prize in Physics in 1923.

== Career ==
After earning his Ph.D., Kelly was offered a job as a research physicist in the engineering department of the Western Electric Company by Frank B. Jewett, who later became the first president of Bell Telephone Laboratories. Kelly worked to provide practical vacuum tubes. He also researched the applications of acoustics in telephony, thermocouples, electrical ballasts and other communication devices. He worked with Clinton Davisson at the time, and later described him as "perhaps my closest friend." Western Electric's engineering department was separately incorporated as Bell Telephone Laboratories in 1925, and Kelly transferred to the new company, where he worked as a research physicist until 1928. He then served as director of vacuum tube development from 1928 until 1934, and development director of transmission instruments and electronics from 1934 to 1936. Between 1922 and 1932, Kelly obtained seven patents related to his work. Kelly's work on vacuum tubes as a researcher and later production chief resulted in the longevity of Western Electric telephone repeater tubes increasing from 1,000 to 80,000 hours. In 1936 he was appointed director of research at Bell Telephone Laboratories.

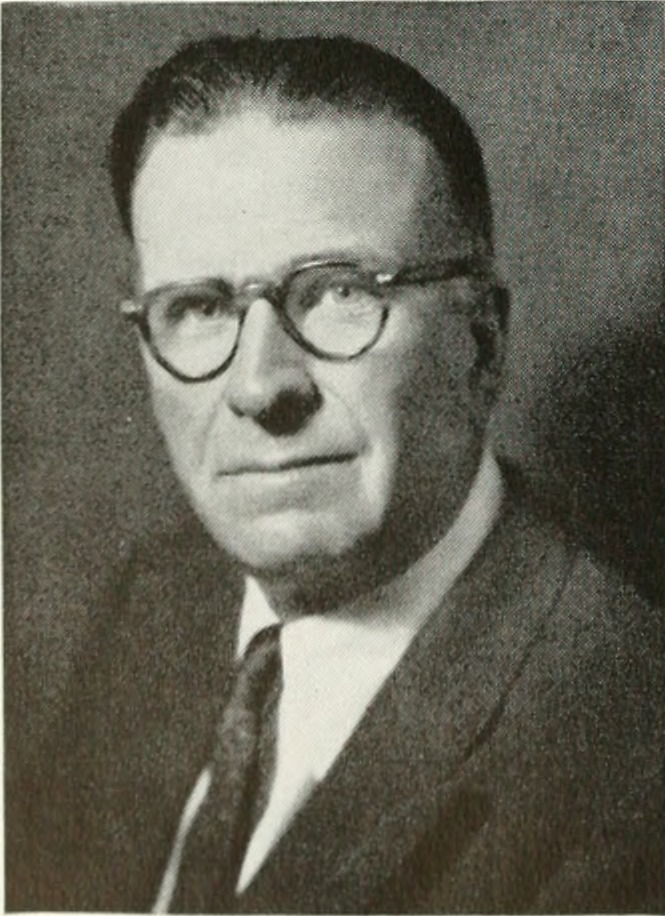
Kelly, photo from the Bell Telephone Magazine, 1953

Beginning in 1938, Kelly was increasingly active in research and development for the United States military. In World War II, Bell was devoted almost entirely to military research and development. Kelly was in charge of all military work at the laboratories, and directed programs whose funding amounted to $175 million (equivalent to $3.1 billion in 2025) for the war period. Wartime research at Bell was centered on radar, gunfire-control systems and bombsights. Kelly was involved in the Tizard Mission, and met with Edward George Bowen to attain information about recent British improvements to the cavity magnetron. Kelly remarked: "Progress has been made in some fields of technology in a four‐year interval that, under normal conditions of peace, would have required from 10 to 20 years." He later provided scientific expertise to various government agencies, such as the United States Department of Commerce and the United States Atomic Energy Commission.

In his role as director of research, Kelly began to recruit solid-state physicists to Bell. Although he worked much of his career on improving vacuum tubes, he viewed vacuum tubes as expensive to produce and unreliable, and sought a solid-state alternative. Among the first solid-state physicists he recruited was William Shockley. As World War II came to an end, Kelly formed a new solid-state research group. He purposely made the group interdisciplinary, teaming chemists, electrical engineers, metallurgists, and technicians with the solid-state physicists. This was in opposition to the discipline-oriented structure of research groups at the company at the time. The group was led by Shockley, who with John Bardeen and Walter Brattain was awarded the Nobel Prize in Physics for the invention of the first operational transistor. Kelly was acknowledged in the 1956 Nobel Prize acceptance speeches of Shockley, Bardeen, and Brattain. Physicist Frederick Seitz wrote that "Kelly can be regarded as the spiritual father of the transistor."

Kelly became executive vice-president of Bell Telephone Laboratories in 1944, and was promoted to president in 1951. During his time as president, Bell developed the solar cell and the laser. Kelly served on the company's board of directors beginning in 1944, and was named chairman of the board of directors on January 1, 1959. He was also a director of the Sandia Corporation, a subsidiary of the Western Electric Company, from 1952 through 1958. In addition, he was a director of the Prudential Insurance Company of America, Bausch & Lomb, Tung-Sol, and the Economic Club of New York. Kelly retired from Bell Telephone Laboratories on March 1, 1959. After his retirement, he became an adviser to the NASA administrator James E. Webb, and acted as a consultant to IBM and Ingersoll Rand.

== Personal life and death ==
On November 11, 1915, Kelly married Katherine Milsted. He once described her as his "most candid critic". They had two children. Kelly was an avid golfer and gardener; his garden contained roughly 20,000 tulips, hyacinths, and narcissi. During growing season, he would begin working in the garden at five o'clock in the morning. He also had a love of music, in particular chamber music. He was a patron of the Summit School of Music in New Jersey, and the Overlook Medical Center.

Kelly had homes in Short Hills, New Jersey and Port St. Lucie, Florida. He was diagnosed with Parkinson's disease in the late 1960s. He died on March 18, 1971, at a country club in Port St. Lucie after choking on a steak, at the age of 77. Kelly was survived by his son, his daughter (wife to lawyer Robert von Mehren), and ten grandchildren. He was cremated and his ashes were scattered into the Gulf of Mexico.

== Awards and recognition ==
Kelly was a fellow of the American Physical Society, the Institute of Electrical and Electronics Engineers, the Acoustical Society of America, and the Rochester Museum of Arts and Sciences. He was also a member of the American Academy of Arts and Sciences, the American Philosophical Society, and the National Academy of Sciences; the honor societies Tau Beta Pi, Sigma Xi, and Eta Kappa Nu; and a foreign member of the Royal Swedish Academy of Sciences.

For his contributions to the American war effort, Kelly was awarded the Presidential Certificate of Merit in 1947. He was also awarded the James Forrestal Memorial Award in 1958 by President Dwight D. Eisenhower, who said of Kelly: "The career of this gifted and dedicated scientist is an inspiration to all to put their talents to the fullest use."

Kelly's alma mater, the Missouri School of Mines and Metallurgy (now the Missouri University of Science and Technology), awarded him with an honorary doctorate in 1939. He was president of the school's Alumni Association from 1948 to 1950, and received its Centennial Medal of Honor in 1970. After Kelly's death in 1971, the school established a scholarship in his name. Kelly was also the recipient of honorary doctorates from the University of Kentucky, the University of Pennsylvania, New York University, the Polytechnic Institute of Brooklyn, the University of Lyon, Wayne State University, the Case Institute of Technology, the University of Pittsburgh, and Princeton University.

Kelly was recognized with the IRI Medal in 1954, the Christopher Columbus International Communication Prize in 1955, the Air Force Exceptional Service Award in 1957, the Air Force Association Trophy Award in 1958, the John Fritz Medal in 1959, the Golden Omega Award in 1960, and the Hoover Medal in 1961. In 1954, he was elevated to Eminent Member by Eta Kappa Nu. In 1959, the Mervin J. Kelly Award for achievement in the field of telecommunications was established, by the American Institute of Electrical Engineers (which later became the Institute of Electrical and Electronics Engineers) and Bell Telephone Laboratories. Kelly was inaugural winner of the award, in 1960. The Mervin J. Kelly Award ran until 1975.
