= Edward Jordan Dimock =

American judge (1890–1986)

Senior Judge of the United States District Court for the Southern District of New York
- In office July 28, 1961 – March 17, 1986

Judge of the United States District Court for the Southern District of New York
- In office July 11, 1951 – July 28, 1961
- Appointed by: Harry S. Truman
- Preceded by: George Murray Hulbert
- Succeeded by: Edward Cochrane McLean

Personal details
- Born: Edward Jordan Dimock; January 4, 1890 Elizabeth, New Jersey
- Died: March 17, 1986 (aged 96) Forestburgh, New York
- Education: Yale University (A.B.); Harvard Law School (LL.B.)

Edward Jordan Dimock (January 4, 1890 – March 17, 1986) was a United States district judge of the United States District Court for the Southern District of New York.

== Education and career ==
Born in Elizabeth, New Jersey, Dimock received an Artium Baccalaureus degree from Yale University in 1911. At Yale, he was an editor of a campus humor magazine The Yale Record. He received a Bachelor of Laws from Harvard Law School in 1914. He was in private practice in New York City from 1914 to 1941, and was a lecturer at Yale Law School from 1941 to 1946, and Editor of the Official Law Reports of the State of New York from 1942 to 1945. He was Chairman of the Appeal Board of the Office of Contract Settlement in Washington, D.C. from 1945 to 1948, and continued as a member of that board until 1951.

== Federal judicial service ==
On June 11, 1951, Dimock was nominated by President Harry S. Truman to a seat on the United States District Court for the Southern District of New York vacated by Judge George Murray Hulbert. Dimock was confirmed by the United States Senate on July 10, 1951, and received his commission on July 11, 1951. He was a member of the Judicial Conference of the United States from 1958 to 1959. He assumed senior status on July 28, 1961. Dimock served in that capacity until his death on March 17, 1986, in Forestburgh, New York.

== Sources ==
Legal offices
Preceded by George Murray Hulbert	Judge of the United States District Court for the Southern District of New York; 1951–1961	Succeeded by Edward Cochrane McLean
