= Solomon Loeb =

German born American banker (1828–1903)

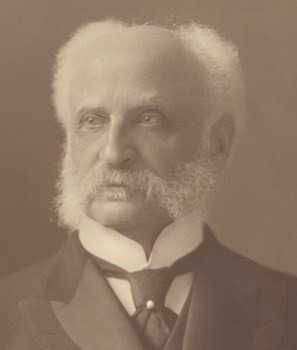
- Born: June 29, 1828; Worms, Rhenish Hesse, Germany
- Died: December 12, 1903 (aged 75); New York City, U.S.
- Occupation: Banker
- Employer: Kuhn, Loeb & Co.
- Spouses: Fanny Kuhn (m. 1852–1854) Betty Gallenberg (m. 1862)
- Children: James Loeb

Solomon Loeb (born Salomon Löb, June 29, 1828 – December 12, 1903) was a German-born American banker and businessman. He was a merchant in textiles and later a banker with Kuhn, Loeb & Co.

== Biography ==
His father, a devout Jew, had been a small corn- and wine-dealer in Worms, which belonged to the Grand Duchy of Hesse and by Rhine. Solomon Loeb immigrated to the United States in 1849. He settled in Cincinnati with the textiles merchant Kuhn, Netter & Co. He moved to New York City in 1865 and with his partner, Abraham Kuhn, started the banking house of Kuhn, Loeb and Co. His second born son, James Loeb, joined the bank in 1888 (and left in 1901). Solomon Loeb gradually retired from running the business but left Kuhn, Loeb & Co. only in 1899. He then started to move into the real estate business. In addition, he was also a generous philanthropist.

Among his donations was the Hebrew Charities Building that formerly stood at Second Avenue and 21st Street in New York City.

== Family ==
- Solomon Loeb, married Fanny Kuhn, sister of Abraham Kuhn, and later Betty Gallenberg.
  - Therese Loeb (1854–1933), married Jacob Schiff (1847–1920), banker
    - Frieda Schiff (1876–1958), married Felix M. Warburg (1871–1937), banker.
      - See Warburg family.
  - Morris Loeb (1863–1912), chemist, married Edna Kuhn (1866–1951), the daughter of Samuel and Regina Wise Kuhn. Samuel Kuhn was a brother of Abraham Kuhn.

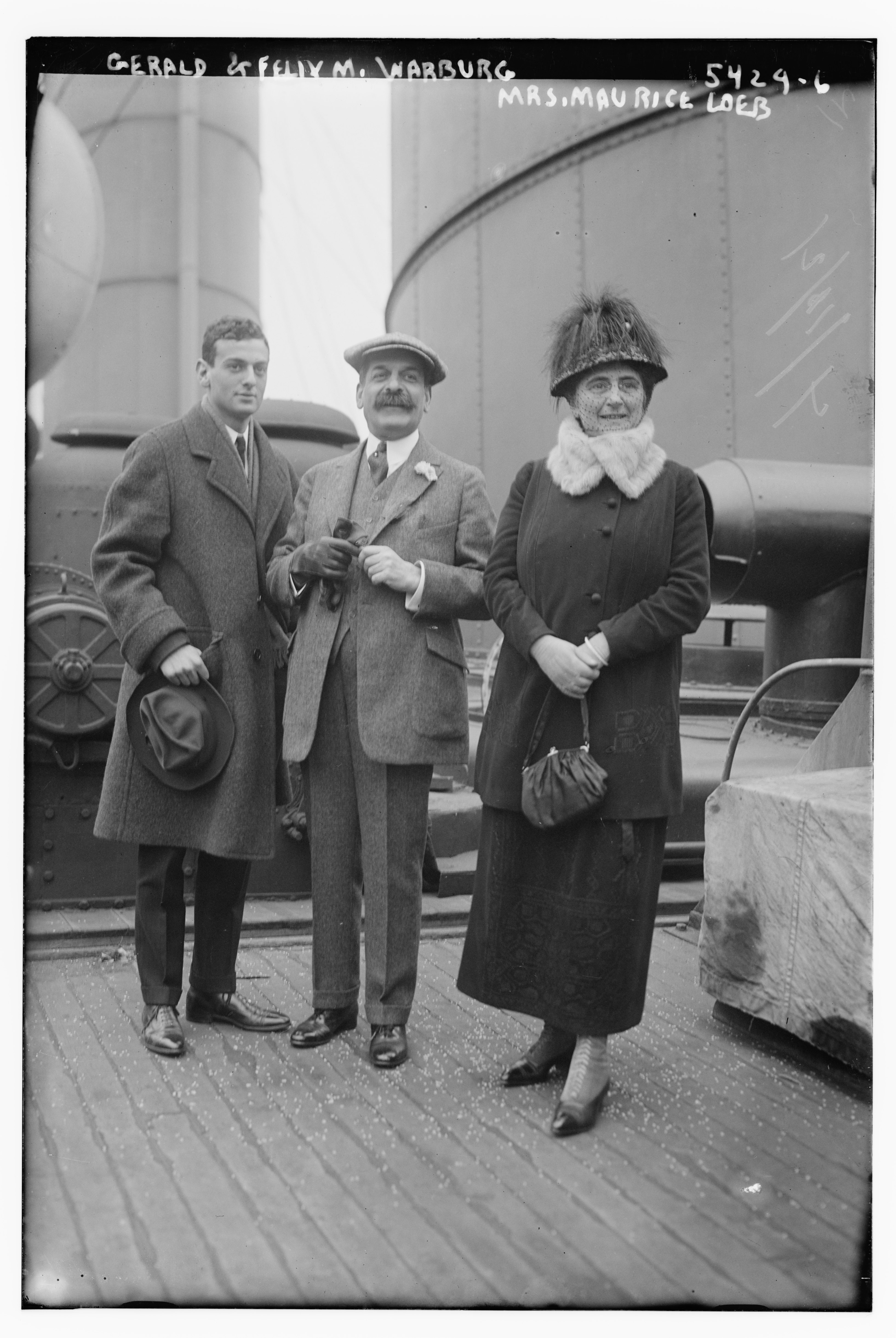
Gerald & Felix M. Warburg with Edna Kuhn (Mrs. Maurice Loeb) c. 1921

  - Guta Loeb (1865–1956), married Isaac Newton Seligman (1855–1917), banker
    - Margaret Valentine Seligman, married to Sam A. Lewisohn (1884–1951), banker, son of Adolph Lewisohn (1849–1938)
  - James Loeb (1867–1933), banker
  - Nina Loeb (1870–1945), married Paul Warburg (1868–1932), banker.
    - James Warburg (1896–1969), banker
      - See Warburg family.
