= Deborah Batts =

American judge (1947–2020)

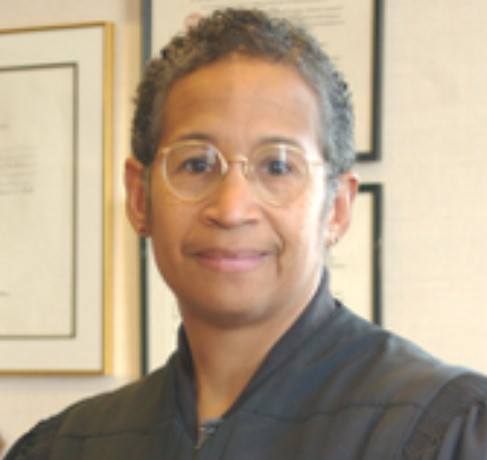

Senior Judge of the United States District Court for the Southern District of New York
- In office April 13, 2012 – February 3, 2020

Judge of the United States District Court for the Southern District of New York
- In office May 9, 1994 – April 13, 2012
- Appointed by: Bill Clinton
- Preceded by: Richard Owen
- Succeeded by: Vernon S. Broderick

Personal details
- Born: Deborah Anne Batts; April 13, 1947 Philadelphia, Pennsylvania, U.S.
- Died: February 3, 2020 (aged 72) New York City, New York, U.S.
- Spouse: Gwen Zornberg (m. 2011)
- Children: 2
- Education: Harvard University (BA, JD)

Deborah Anne Batts (April 13, 1947 – February 3, 2020) was a United States district judge of the United States District Court for the Southern District of New York. During Gay Pride Week in June 1994, Batts was sworn in as a United States district judge for Manhattan, becoming the nation's first openly LGBT federal judge. She took senior status on her 65th birthday, April 13, 2012.

== Early life and education ==
Batts was born in Philadelphia, Pennsylvania, to James Alexander Batts, director of the department of obstetrics and gynecology at Harlem Hospital Center, and Ruth V. Batts, a nurse, homemaker, and board member of the Philadelphia Home and School Council in the 1960s.

Batts received a Bachelor of Arts degree in government from Radcliffe College of Harvard University in 1969 and a Juris Doctor from Harvard Law School in 1972. She subsequently clerked for Judge Lawrence W. Pierce of the United States district court on which she served as a judge until her death. She was an Assistant United States Attorney from 1979 to 1984. In 1984, she became the first African American faculty member and an associate professor of law at Fordham University School of Law. She was a special associate counsel to the Department of Investigation for New York City from 1990 to 1991. Outside of work, Batts dedicated her time to the RISE program, aiming to lower recidivism amongst at-risk offenders and continued to teach at the Fordham University School of Law.

== Federal judicial service ==
On January 27, 1994, following the recommendation of Senator Daniel Patrick Moynihan, President Bill Clinton nominated Batts to a seat on the Southern District left open in 1989 when Judge Richard Owen took senior status. Batts was confirmed by the United States Senate on May 6, 1994, and received her commission on May 9, 1994. She took senior status on April 13, 2012. She continued to serve concurrently as an adjunct professor at Fordham University.

She served until her death on February 3, 2020, from complications during knee surgery.

On October 3, 2007, Bourne Co. Music Publishers filed a lawsuit accusing Family Guy of infringing its copyright on the song "When You Wish Upon a Star", through a parody song titled "I Need a Jew" appearing in the episode "When You Wish Upon a Weinstein". Bourne Co., which holds the copyright, alleged the parody pairs a "thinly veiled" copy of their music with antisemitic lyrics. Named in the suit were Family Guy creator Seth MacFarlane, 20th Century Fox Film Corp., Fox Broadcasting Co., Cartoon Network, and Walter Murphy; the suit sought to stop the program's distribution and asked for unspecified damages. Bourne argued that "I Need a Jew" uses the copyrighted melody of "When You Wish Upon a Star" without commenting on that song, and that it was therefore not a First Amendment-protected parody per the ruling in Campbell v. Acuff-Rose Music, Inc. On March 16, 2009, Batts held that Family Guy did not infringe on Bourne's copyright when it transformed the song for comical use in an episode.

In 2007, Batts was a prominent figure in the litigation over the case of the Central Park Five, permitting the Central Park Five's lawsuit against the City of New York for malicious prosecution and racial discrimination to proceed to trial.

== Personal life ==
Batts's siblings included sisters Mercedes Ellington and Denise Batts, and her twin, Diane Batts Morrow. She was raised Roman Catholic.

She was married to Ira A. McCown, with whom she had two children, Alexandra S. McCown and James Ellison McCown. In 2011, Batts married Gwen Zornberg.

== See also ==
- List of African-American federal judges
- List of African-American jurists
- List of first women lawyers and judges in New York
- List of first women lawyers and judges in the United States
- List of LGBT jurists in the United States

== Sources ==
Legal offices
Preceded by Richard Owen	Judge of the United States District Court for the Southern District of New York; 1994–2012	Succeeded by Vernon S. Broderick
