= Joseph L. Buttenwieser =

American lawyer

Joseph Leon Buttenwieser
- Born: 1865; Philadelphia, Pennsylvania
- Died: 1938 (age 73); New York City, U.S.
- Occupations: Attorney; Philanthropist
- Spouse: Caroline Weil Buttenwieser
- Children: 5, including Benjamin Joseph Buttenwieser
- Parent: Laemmlein Buttenwieser
- Family: Helen Lehman Buttenwieser (daughter-in-law); Peter L. Buttenwieser (grandson)

Joseph Leon Buttenwieser (1865–1938) was an American lawyer, philanthropist, and civic leader in New York.

== Biography ==
Buttenwieser was born to a Jewish family in Philadelphia, Pennsylvania, the son of immigrants from Germany. Buttenwieser practiced law and used the proceeds to invest in real estate and was a driver of real property legislation changes in New York state. Buttenwieser was active in Jewish philanthropic activities. He helped to found the Federation for the Support of Jewish Philanthropic Societies and served as its president from 1924–1926; he was on the board of directors at the Hebrew Technical Institute, the Hebrew Sheltering Guardian Society, United Hebrew Charities, the, United Palestine Appeal, and the Associated Alumni of City College. He was married to Caroline Weil; they had five children: Clara Buttenwieser Unger; Florence Buttenwieser Klingenstein; Clarence Buttenwieser; Benjamin Buttenwieser and Gertrude C. Buttenwieser Prins. Their son Benjamin married Helen Lehman Buttenwieser. Benjamin made junior partner at Kuhn, Loeb & Co., a former, well renowned investment banking firm from NYC, and was also personally chosen as Assistant High Commissioner to Germany after WWII by acting commissioner John J. McCloy.
