= Peter L. Buttenwieser =

American educator and philanthropist

- Born: Peter Lehman Buttenwieser; December 9, 1935; New York City, U.S.
- Died: February 4, 2018 (aged 82); New York City, U.S.
- Education: Columbia College (BA); Harvard University (MA); Teacher's College, Columbia University (PhD)
- Occupation: educator
- Known for: political fundraising
- Spouses: Elizabeth Werthan (div.); Terry Ann Marek
- Children: Sarah Buttenwieser; Julie Buttenwieser Suh
- Parents: Benjamin Buttenwieser (father); Helen Lehman Buttenwieser (mother)
- Family: Lehman family

Peter Lehman Buttenwieser (December 9, 1935 – February 4, 2018) was an American educator, philanthropist, and Democratic Party fundraiser. He was a member of the Lehman family.

== Biography ==
Buttenwieser was born in New York City to investment banker Benjamin Buttenwieser and lawyer Helen Lehman Buttenwieser. His paternal grandfather was real-estate developer Joseph L. Buttenwieser and his mother's family owned Lehman Brothers. His mother was a niece of Herbert H. Lehman, who served as the United States senator from New York and the 45th governor of New York. Through his mother, he is a cousin of John Langeloth Loeb Jr., former United States ambassador to Denmark and grandson of Carl M. Loeb, namesake of the brokerage Loeb, Rhoades & Co.

He attended the Putney School in Vermont and graduated from Columbia College in 1958. He then received his master's degree in history from Harvard University before earning a doctorate from Teachers College, Columbia University.

Buttenwieser taught at the Dalton School for two years before leaving for Uganda as part of a federal teaching exchange program. During the mid-1960s, he taught in Winston-Salem, North Carolina, headed the Pennsylvania Advancement School, and founded the Durham Child Development Center in 1970.

Later in his life, Buttenwieser became involved in politics and was, as described by Mother Jones magazine in 2004, among the most generous Democratic donors for nearly a decade. In 1997, he was the fourth largest "soft money" donor to the Democratic Party, and was the sixth largest donor in 1999. He was also among the largest political contributors in Pennsylvania and supported for the campaigns of prominent politicians such as Ed Rendell, Paul Wellstone, Michelle Nunn, Tammy Baldwin, and Bob Casey Jr. During the 2000 United States presidential election alone, he donated $1 million to various Democratic Party candidates.

Buttenwieser served on the board of EMILY's List to help advance female candidates and of the Brady Center to Prevent Gun Violence. He was also an inaugural member of the "Chairman's Circle" of the Democratic National Committee, set up for donors of at least $500,000.

== Personal life ==
In 1960, Buttenwieser married Radcliffe College graduate Elizabeth Werthan, daughter of Albert Werthan, chairman of Nashville-based Werthan Industries. They had two daughters, Sarah Buttenwieser and Julie Suh, before divorcing.

His daughter, Julie Buttenwieser, was educated at Germantown Friends School and Barnard College. She is married to Gibson Dunn partner and sports litigation lawyer Maurice Suh, who was a former deputy mayor of Los Angeles in charge of public safety under Antonio Villaraigosa. He received his bachelor's degree and law degree from Columbia University and was known for defending Floyd Landis during his doping case.

In 1986, Buttenwieser remarried Terry Ann Marek, who had a daughter before the marriage.

Buttenwieser died on February 4, 2018, of acute myeloid leukemia at his home outside Philadelphia.
