= Abraham Kuhn (banker) =

American businessman

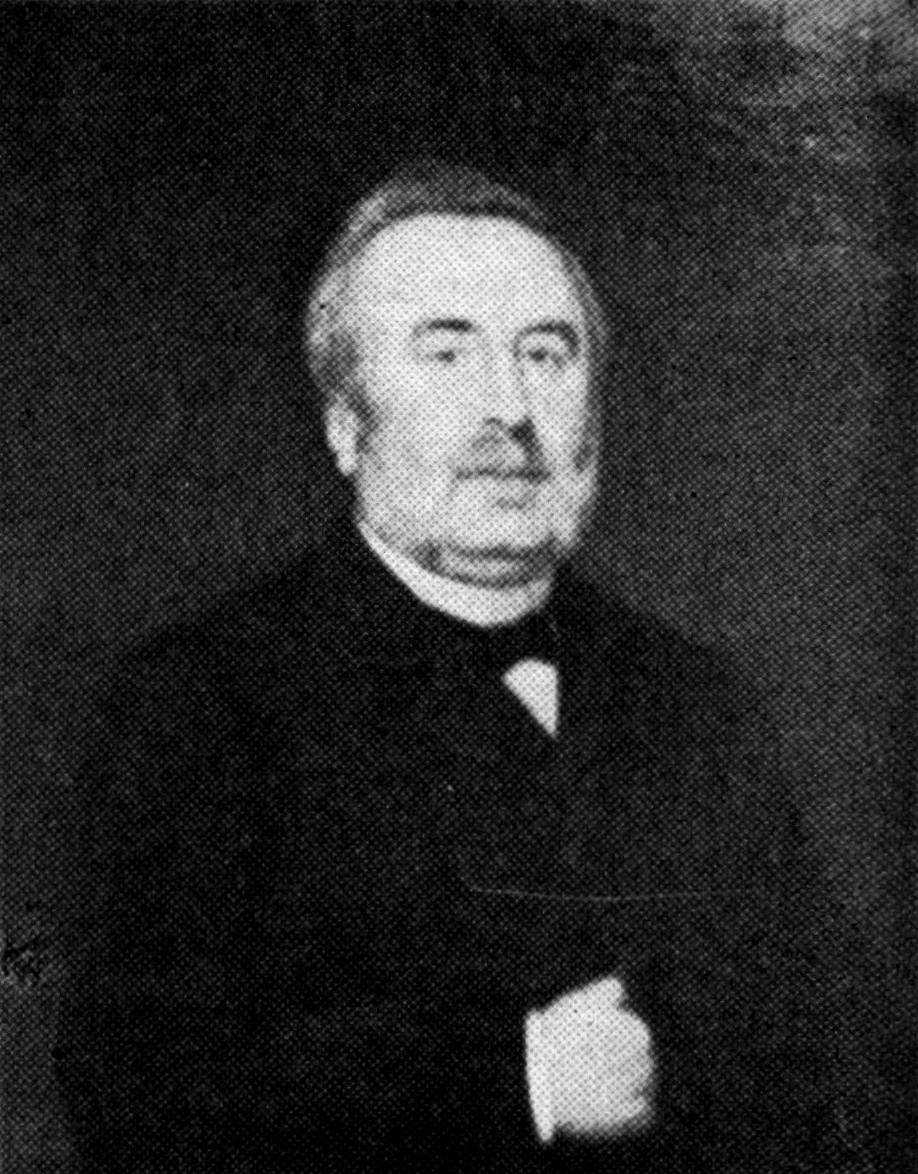
Abraham Kuhn

Abraham Kuhn (June 20, 1819 – May 30, 1892) was an American merchant and banker of Jewish German origin, a founding partner in 1867 of New York City's Kuhn, Loeb & Co., one of the great US investment-banking firms of the 19th and 20th centuries.

== Biography ==
Born the son of Simon and Therese Kuhn in Harxheim, a village near Mainz, in the Grand Duchy of Hesse, now part of the Rhineland-Palatinate, Kuhn migrated to New York about 1840, with his brothers Solomon and Max. In 1849, he married Regina Loeb, a sister of his future partner, Solomon Loeb. In 1849 he was earning a living in the US as a peddler. In 1850, he formed a general partnership in a merchandising firm in Lafayette, Indiana, with his brother-in-law Solomon Loeb, and by 1860, they were manufacturers of men's clothing and had a successful dry-goods merchant business in Cincinnati, Ohio. They made their fortune from making and supplying uniforms to the military.

In 1865, Kuhn, Loeb, and another man, Samuel Wolff, turned away from the clothing industry to focus their business activities on banking, and in 1867 they established Kuhn, Loeb and Company in New York to take advantage of the economic expansion of the 1860s. By the time Kuhn and Loeb established their new partnership, they were able to capitalize it at $500,000. However, following the death of his wife, in 1869 Kuhn withdrew from active participation in the business and returned to Germany with his young daughters Ida (born 1854) and Emily, settling at number 14 Feuerbachstrasse, Frankfurt, in his native Hesse, a house with a large garden. He remained a partner in Kuhn, Loeb, until 1887.

In Frankfurt Kuhn met Jacob Schiff (1847–1920) at the house of a fellow banker, Jacques Dreyfus, and sent Schiff to work for Kuhn, Loeb in New York. Schiff married Therese Loeb, the daughter of Solomon Loeb and of Kuhn's sister Fannie, and went on to grow the firm into the second most prestigious investment bank in the United States, outdone only by Morgan's J. P. Morgan & Co.

Kuhn died in 1892 at Frankfurt. He had recently created a charitable foundation known as the Stipendienstiftung in Bad Dürkheim.

Kuhn's daughter Ida married Eduard Cohen and was the mother of Emilie (Mimi), Sophie, Edwin, and Albert Cohen, but the two sons died in infancy. Emilie (Mimi) married a notable Egyptologist, Ludwig Borchardt. In 1903, she received an inheritance from Kuhn of 150,000 Marks and spent most of it on buying a villa in Cairo. This was a substantial fortune, then exchangeable for 53.7 kilograms of gold.
