= Richard Owen (judge) =

American judge

Senior Judge of the United States District Court for the Southern District of New York
- In office September 30, 1989 – November 20, 2015

Judge of the United States District Court for the Southern District of New York
- In office December 19, 1973 – September 30, 1989
- Appointed by: Richard Nixon
- Preceded by: Edward Cochrane McLean
- Succeeded by: Deborah Batts

Personal details
- Born: Richard Owen; December 11, 1922 New York City, New York, U.S.
- Died: November 20, 2015 (aged 92) New York City, New York, U.S.
- Education: Dartmouth College (AB); Harvard University (LLB)

Military service
- Branch/service: United States Army
- Unit: United States Army Air Corps

Richard Owen (December 11, 1922 – November 20, 2015) was an American attorney, jurist, and composer who served as a United States district judge of the United States District Court for the Southern District of New York.

== Early life and education ==
The son of an opera-loving attorney, Owen was born and raised in New York City. He served in the United States Army Air Corps from 1942 to 1945, and then received an Artium Baccalaureus degree from Dartmouth College in 1945. He received a Bachelor of Laws from Harvard Law School in 1950

== Career ==
After earning his law degree, Owen entered private practice in New York City from 1950 to 1953. He was also an assistant professor at New York Law School from 1951 to 1953. In 1953, Owen became an assistant United States attorney for the Southern District of New York, also serving as a special assistant United States attorney general in 1954. He was a senior trial attorney in the Antitrust Division of the United States Department of Justice from 1955 to 1958. He returned to private practice in New York City from 1958 to 1974, also working as associate counsel to the New York State Commission on Alcoholic Beverage Laws from 1963 to 1964.

Owen presided over the Mafia Commission Trial and sentenced eight convicted defendants of racketeering on January 13, 1987.

=== Federal judicial service ===
On November 15, 1973, Owen was nominated by President Richard Nixon to a seat on the United States District Court for the Southern District of New York vacated by Judge Edward Cochrane McLean. Owen was confirmed by the United States Senate on December 13, 1973, and received his commission on December 19, 1973. He assumed senior status on September 30, 1989. His service terminated on November 20, 2015, due to his death in New York City.

== Personal life ==
From 1960 until his death, Owen was married to Wisconsin-born Lynn Rasmussen, an opera singer.

== Musical career ==
Owen was also a composer, and "dabbled in music all his life". He studied piano as a child and again once he finished law school. He studied composition with Vittorio Giannini and Robert Starer. His opera Abigail Adams, based on the lives of the second president and his wife, was first produced in 1987. Five of his art songs were published by the General Music Publishing Company between 1962 and 1973; they are known for their declamation and dramatic qualities.

=== Operas and other musical works ===
- Dismissed With Prejudice, opera, mid-1950s, presented under the auspices of the New York City Bar Association
- A Moment of War, one-act opera, 1958
- A Fisherman Called Peter, sacred concert piece/opera, 1965
- Mary Dyer, opera, 1976
- The Death of the Virgin, opera, libretto by Michael Whitney Straight, 1980/1983
- Abigail Adams, opera, 1987
- American Stereopticon, orchestral piece, 1988, unpublished
- Tom Sawyer, opera, 1989
- Rain, opera, 2003

=== Songs ===
published by General Music Publishing/Boston Music

- The Impulse (1966, text by Robert Frost from The Hill Wife)
- I Saw a Man Pursuing the Horizon (1966, text by Stephen Crane)
- Patterns (1973, text by Amy Lowell)
- There were many who went in Huddled Procession (1966, text by Stephen Crane)
- Till we watch the Last Low Star (1962, text by Witter Bynner)

unpublished

- I felt a funeral in my brain (1981, text by Emily Dickinson)
- Morning musings (1982, text by Emily Dickinson)
- The last night she lived (1981, text by Emily Dickinson)

== Sources ==
- Carman, Judith E., with William K. Gaeddert, Rita M. Resch, and Gordon Myers (2001), Art Songs in the United States, 1759-1999 (Third ed.), Lanham, Maryland, and London: Scarecrow Press, ISBN 0-8108-4137-1
- Villamil, Victoria Etnier (1993), A Singer's Guide to The American Art Song 1870-1980, Lanham, Maryland, and London: The Scarecrow Press, Inc., pp. 98–100, ISBN 0-8108-2774-3

Legal offices
Preceded by Edward Cochrane McLean	Judge of the United States District Court for the Southern District of New York; 1973–1989	Succeeded by Deborah Batts
