= Chester T. Lane =

20th-century American attorney and SEC official

- Born: Chester Tevis Lane; June 7, 1905; London, UK
- Died: March 12, 1959 (aged 53); New York City, US
- Occupations: Lawyer, government counsel, professor
- Years active: 1931–1959
- Known for: Appeal by Alger Hiss
- Spouse: Persis McClennen
- Children: 4

Academic background
- Education: Harvard University
- Alma mater: Harvard Law School

Chester T. Lane (1905–1959) was counsel to the newly formed Security and Exchange Commission, a Lend-Lease administrator, and later, as a partner at Beer, Richards, Lane, Haller & Buttenwieser, was defense counsel to Alger Hiss during appeal.

== Background ==
Chester Tevis Lane was born on June 7, 1905, in London, United Kingdom, to American parents. He had a brother and sister. In 1926, he graduated from Harvard University. In 1930, he graduated from Harvard Law School, where he also taught and tutored in classics. In 1931, he passed the New York bar.

== Career ==
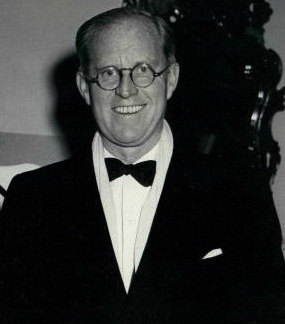
Joseph P. Kennedy Sr. (here, 1940), was the first SEC chairman around the time Lane joined

In 1931, Lane went to work at the law firm Murray, Aldrich & Webb, after which that firm merged into Milbank LLP, Tweed, Hope & Webb.

In 1935, Lane joined the staff of the newly formed Security and Exchange Commission (SEC) as counsel; in January 1937, he became assistant general counsel. In 1938, he became SEC general counsel.

During World War II, Lane served as special assistant to the United States Attorney General: associate chief of the Special War Policies Unit at the Justice Department (1942), chairman of Justice's Civilian Legal Personnel Commission (1942), head of post-war Lend-Lease Administration and senior consultant to the Army-Navy Liquidation Commission.

In 1947, Lane returned to private practice by helping form Beer, Richards, Lane, Haller & Buttenwieser. He worked there through 1959 and specialized in Securities Regulation, Administrative Law, Trademarks, and Unfair Competition. In 1949, he began lecturing at the New York University Law School until his death in 1959. Harold Rosenwald (one of the first lawyers to join the Alger Hiss defense team) was a member of the firm.

== Hiss case appeal ==
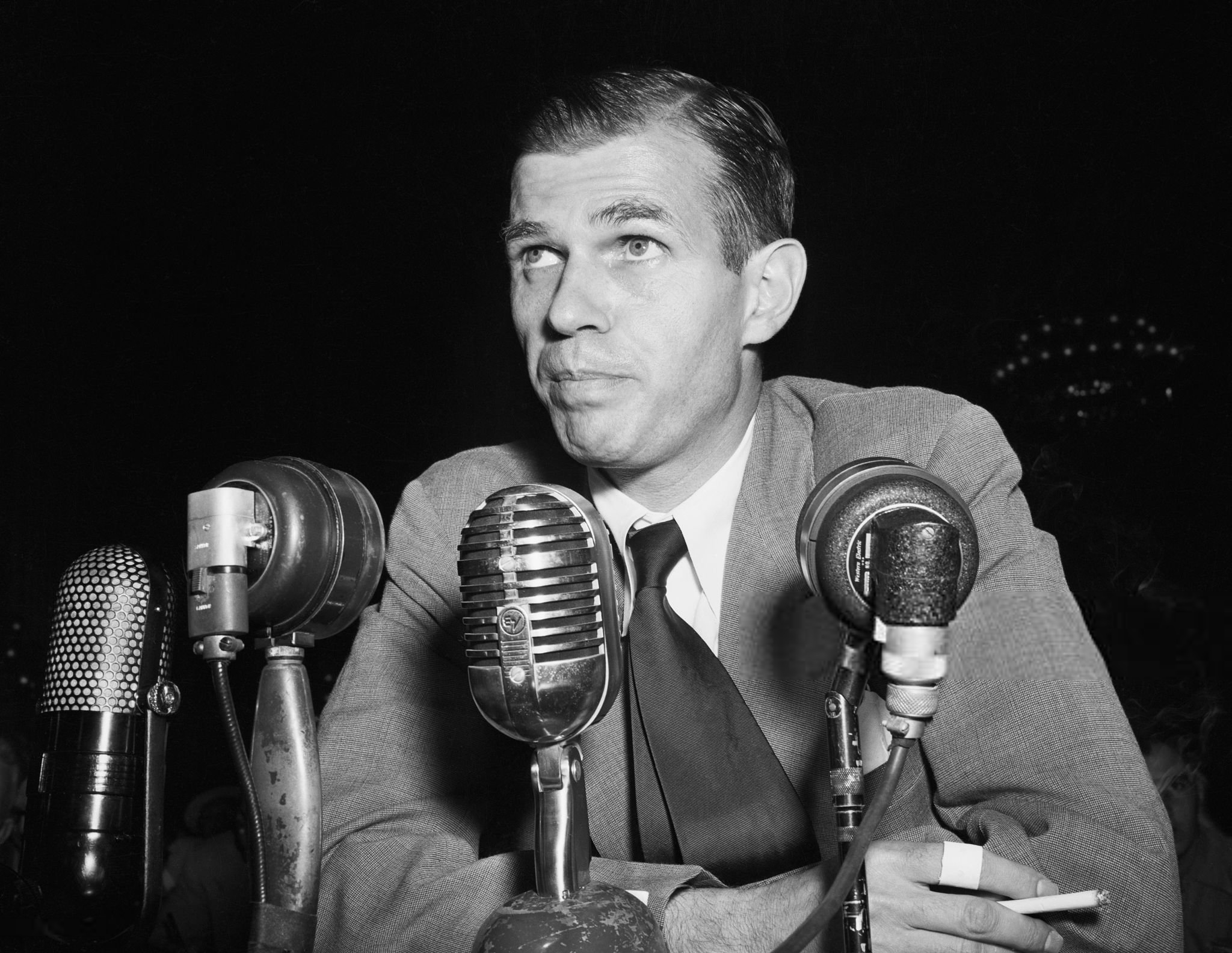
Lane led the appeal by Alger Hiss (here, 1948), following Hiss' conviction on two counts of perjury

In 1950, Lane became defense counsel to Alger Hiss in his appeal on conviction for two counts of perjury in January 1950. The appeal started in 1950 as United States vs. Alger Hiss, 185 F. 2d 822 with appellant counsel listed as Robert M. Benjamin, Harold Rosenwald, Chester T. Lane, and Kenneth Simon.

In January 1952, Lane's defense begin; it focused on attacking the Woodstock N230099 typewriter as "planted." Lane cited expert Dr. Daniel P. Norman of Skinner & Sherman (Boston) (who found that typewriter had been "altered" by soldering new typeface "sloppily" some time before the Hiss defense team discovered the typewriter on April 16, 1949), so that Lane concluded that testimony by Whittaker Chambers regarding the "Baltimore Documents" was a "fabrication."

In April 1952, The New York Times covered Lane's efforts, reporting how Lane called testimony by Chambers "false," claimed that "his fraudulent plot now stands exposed," and stated he had new evidence that showed untrue that Hiss' wife, Priscilla Hiss, had typed up State Department documents on the Woodstock typewriter. Lane speculated, "Some signs point to the conclusion that, though his personal interest may have been to protect himself in the libel suit [$75.000 libel action brought by Hiss against Mr. Chambers], the availability of the means for such self-preservation may have been part of a much larger scheme involving other people and for larger objectives than the mere framing of Alger Hiss."

The appeal continued as United States of America, Appellee, v. Alger Hiss, Appellant, 201 F.2d 372 (2d Cir. 1953), with counsel listed as Chester T. Lane, Robert M. Benjamin and Helen L. Buttenwieser.

Lane's efforts proved unsuccessful.

== Personal life and death ==
In 1927, Lane married Persis McClennen; they had four children.

Lane was a member of the American Bar Association and of the Association of the Bar of the City of New York.

Chester T. Lane died age 53 on March 13, 1959, in New York City of a heart attack.

== Works ==
- De Spe Harvardiana loquitur C.T. Lane (1926)
- Reminiscences of Chester Tevis Lane (1951)

== See also ==
- Alger Hiss
- Helen Buttenwieser
- Harold Rosenwald
- Security and Exchange Commission

== External sources ==
- Harvard University: Chester T. Lane SEC briefs (1937–1942)
- SEC: Chester T. Lane opinion 1940
- SEC: Chester T. Lane speeches 1939
- SEC: Chester T. Lane speeches 1938
