= James Loeb =

American banker, Hellenist and philanthropist (1867–1933)

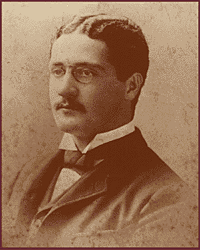
- Loeb in his youth, possibly during his time at Harvard
- Born: August 6, 1867; New York City, New York, U.S.
- Died: May 27, 1933 (aged 65); Murnau am Staffelsee, Bavaria, Germany
- Education: Harvard College
- Occupation: Banker
- Father: Solomon Loeb

James Loeb (/loʊb/; German: [løːp]; August 6, 1867 – May 27, 1933) was an American banker, Hellenist, and philanthropist.

== Biography ==
James Loeb, of German-Jewish descent, was the second son of Solomon and Betty Loeb. James Loeb joined his father at Kuhn, Loeb & Co. in New York City in 1888 and was made partner in 1894, but he retired from the bank in 1901 due to severe illness.

In memory of his former lecturer and friend Charles Eliot Norton, Loeb created The Charles Eliot Norton Memorial Lectureship in 1907. In 1911, he founded and endowed the Loeb Classical Library. He assembled a team of Anglo-American classicists to oversee the series, and arranged for publication through the publisher Heinemann in London. Loeb bequeathed the Loeb Classical Library and funds to Harvard University to establish The Loeb Classical Library Foundation and to support research in the classics.

He founded the Institute of Musical Art, which later became part of the Juilliard School of Music. That year he also turned over his collection of Arretine pottery to the Fogg Art Museum at Harvard.

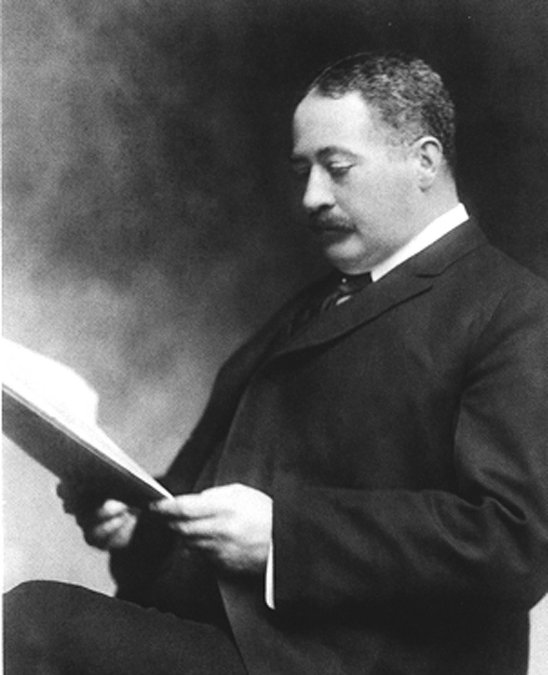
Loeb in his 30s

He donated a large amount of funds to what became the Max Planck Institute of Psychiatry, which helped his former psychiatrist Emil Kraepelin to establish and maintain the Institute in its early days. Nevertheless, presumably unknown to Loeb, Kraepelin held racist views about Jews, and his student who took over the Institute, Ernst Rudin, was a leading advocate of racial hygiene and forced sterilization or killing of psychiatric inpatients for which he was personally honored by Adolf Hitler.

Loeb left a large portion of his significant art collection to the Museum Antiker Kleinkunst in Munich, which became the Staatliche Antikensammlungen ("Sammlung James Loeb"). He was a member of the English Society for the Promotion of Hellenic Studies.

Loeb's correspondence with Aby Warburg has been characterized as creating a Renaissance of relationships of the European to classical antiquity.

== Translations ==
- Paul Delcharme, Euripides and the Spirit of His Dreams
- Maurice Croiset, Aristophanes and the Political Parties at Athens
- Auguste Couat, Alexandrian Poetry under the First Three Ptolemies, 324-222 B.C.
