= Edward Cochrane McLean =

American judge

Judge of the United States District Court for the Southern District of New York
- In office August 24, 1962 – October 12, 1972
- Appointed by: John F. Kennedy
- Preceded by: Edward Jordan Dimock
- Succeeded by: Richard Owen

Personal details
- Born: Edward Cochrane McLean; October 16, 1903 Hoosick Falls, New York
- Died: October 12, 1972 (aged 68) New York City, New York
- Party: Republican
- Education: Williams College (AB); Harvard University (LLB)

Edward Cochrane McLean (October 16, 1903 – October 12, 1972) was a United States district judge of the United States District Court for the Southern District of New York.

== Education ==
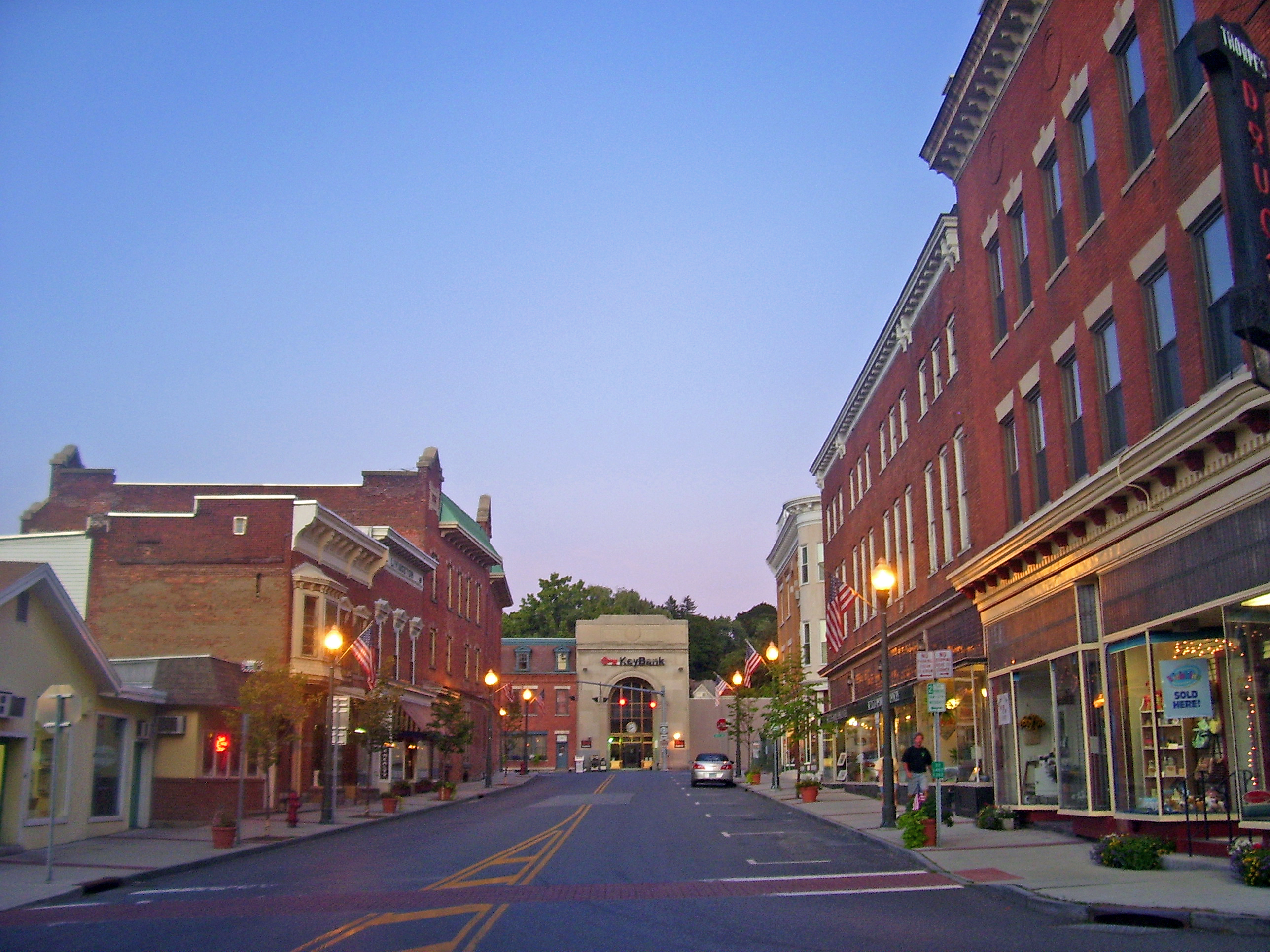
Hoosick Falls, New York, McLean's home town

Born on October 16, 1903, in Hoosick Falls, New York, McLean received an Artium Baccalaureus degree from Williams College in 1924 and a Bachelor of Laws from Harvard Law School in 1929. While at Harvard, he served on the Harvard Law Review with Lee Pressman and knew Alger Hiss. (In the mid-1930s, both Pressman and Hiss became members of the Ware Group, a Soviet underground apparatus founded by Harold Ware, succeeded by Whittaker Chambers).

== Career ==
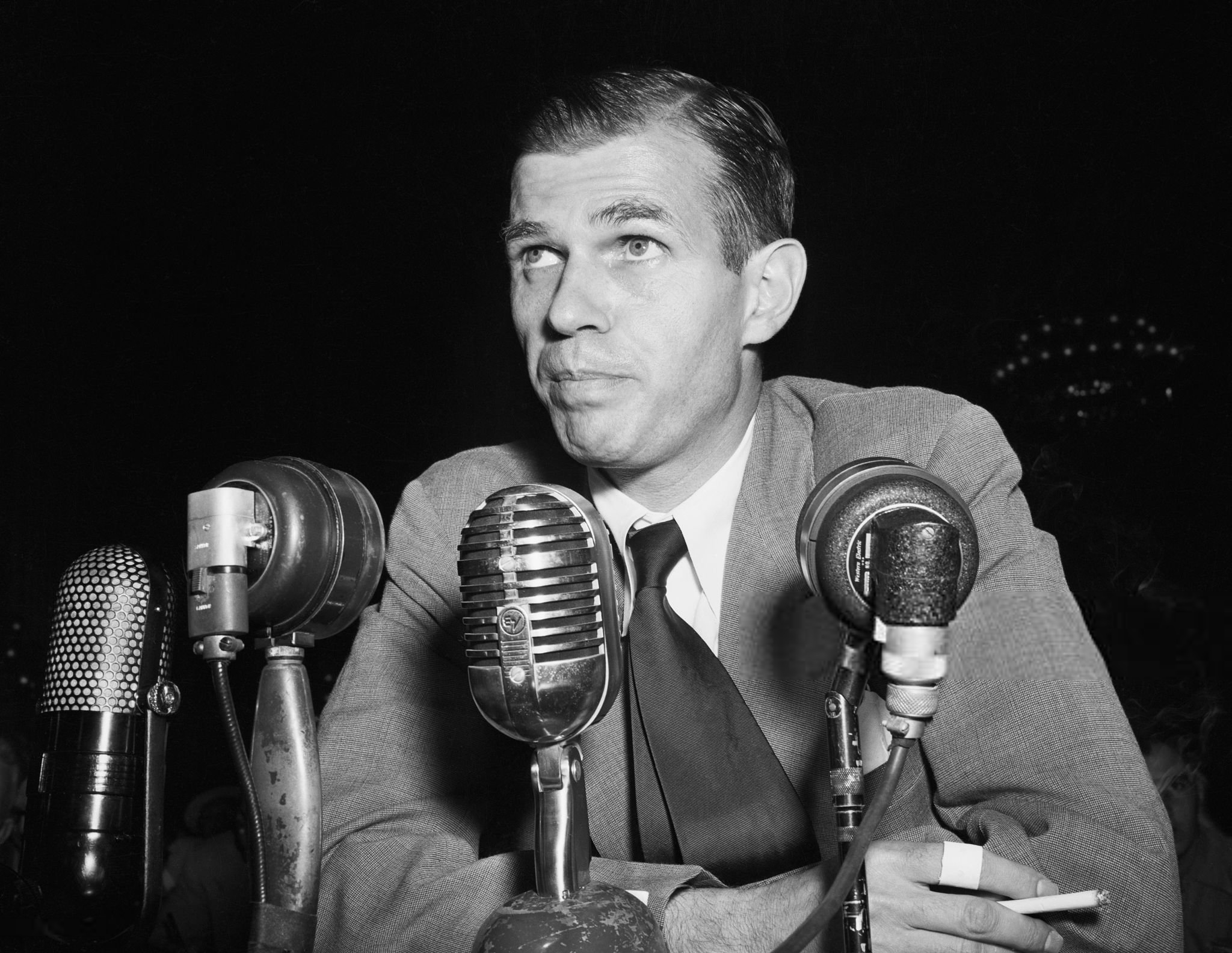
Alger Hiss (1948), whom McLean defended

McLean served as a deputy assistant district attorney for New York County from 1935 to 1936, working for future Governor of New York Thomas E. Dewey, then the special rackets prosecutor. He entered private practice in New York City from 1943 to 1962. He was a Judge of the Darien, Connecticut Probate Court from 1957 to 1962.

=== Hiss Case ===
While in private practice with Debevoise, Plimpton and McLean (now Debevoise & Plimpton), McLean served on defense teams for Alger Hiss. He served as attorney of record for the Hiss libel suit as well as the first Hiss criminal trial and posted bail for Hiss after his indictment. His firm also coordinated finances for the trials (recorded in papers of common Harvard friend Richard H. Field). The trial team included Robert von Mehren, also new to Debevoise, Plimpton and McLean, as well as Harold Rosenwald, both fellow Harvard Law School graduates. McLean played a major role in locating the Hiss family's Woodstock typewriter that later contributed to Hiss' conviction. McLean continued to represent Hiss until he resigned by letter to Hiss on February 3, 1950.

== Federal judicial service ==
On April 3, 1962, McLean was nominated by President John F. Kennedy to a seat on the United States District Court for the Southern District of New York vacated by Judge Edward Jordan Dimock. McLean was confirmed by the United States Senate on July 13, 1962, and received his commission on August 24, 1962. McLean served in that capacity until his death on October 12, 1972.

== Personal and death ==
McLean was a Republican, president of the Harvard Law School Association of New York City, and member of the Century Club. McLean married Louise Delabarre Hunter (May 15, 1906 – October 21, 2004). They had two sons, Edward C. McLean Jr. and Alan H. McLean. McLean died age 68 on October 12, 1972, in New York City as he was entering the United States Court House at Foley Square.

== McLean Jr. ==
McLean's son, Edward Cochrane McLean Jr. (1935–2010), also known at Ted McLean, was a litigation lawyer and partner at Chadbourne & Parke. He was born on June 23, 1935, and attended Deerfield Academy, Princeton University (BA), and Harvard Law School (1960). He passed the bar in 1961. He served six months in the U.S. Army. Then, he became a litigation attorney and partner of Chadbourne & Parke from 1961 (partner, 1968) to 1994. Cases he litigated include: Sprayregen v. Livingston Oil Company (1968), Martin Marietta Corp. v. Feder (1970), Crane Co. v. Anaconda Co. (1975), Air Transport Ass'n of America v. Federal Energy Office (1975), Armstrong v. McAlpin (1978), and Seibert v. Sperry Rand (1978) McLean served as committee chair on administrative law from 1971 to 1972 for the American Bar Association. He served on the New Castle, New York's Planning Board, Conservation Advisory Council, and Conservation Board. On November 25, 1961, he married Jennifer Prescott (daughter of book critic Orville Prescott) and had two daughters and a son.

== See also ==
- Alger Hiss
- Robert von Mehren
- Debevoise & Plimpton
- United States District Court for the Southern District of New York

== Sources ==
Legal offices
Preceded by Edward Jordan Dimock	Judge of the United States District Court for the Southern District of New York; 1962–1972	Succeeded by Richard Owen
