= Vernon S. Broderick =

American judge (born 1963)

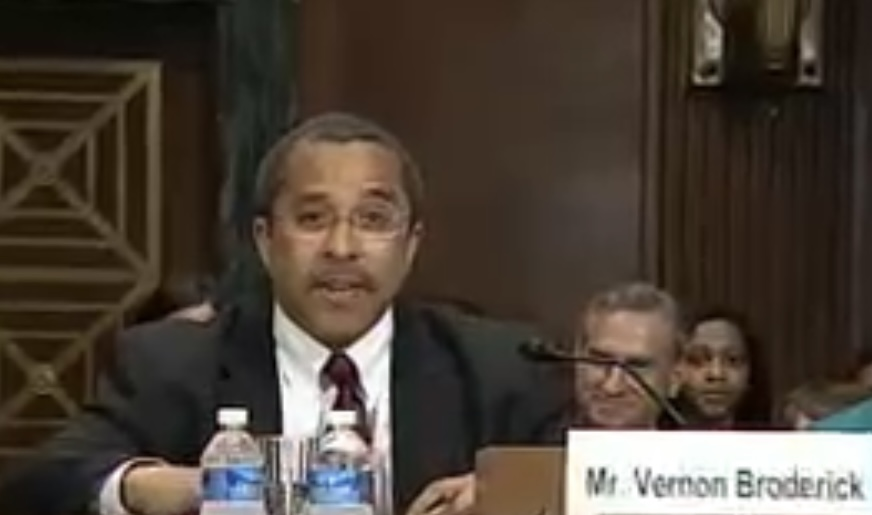

Judge of the United States District Court for the Southern District of New York
- Incumbent
- Assumed office September 10, 2013
- Appointed by: Barack Obama
- Preceded by: Deborah Batts

Personal details
- Born: March 11, 1963 (age 63) New York City, New York, U.S.
- Education: Yale University (BA); Harvard University (JD)

Vernon Speede Broderick (born March 11, 1963) is a United States district judge of the United States District Court for the Southern District of New York.

== Biography ==
Broderick was born in 1963, in New York City. He received his Bachelor of Arts degree in 1985 from Yale University. He received his Juris Doctor in 1988 from Harvard Law School. He began his career at the law firm of Weil, Gotshal & Manges LLP from 1988 to 1994. He served as an Assistant United States Attorney in the Southern District of New York from 1994 to 2002 and was Chief of the Violent Gangs Unit from 1999 to 2002. Broderick rejoined Weil, Gotshal & Manges LLP in 2002 as Counsel, becoming a partner in 2005, concentrating his practice on white collar crimes, regulatory investigations and business litigation. In 2003, he was appointed to the commission to Combat Police Corruption by Mayor Michael Bloomberg. In 2011, he was appointed to the New York State Commission on Public Integrity by Governor Andrew Cuomo.

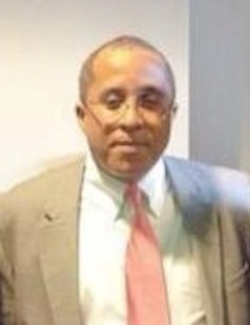
Vernon S. Broderick

=== Federal judicial service ===
On April 15, 2013, President Barack Obama nominated Broderick to serve as a United States district judge of the United States District Court for the Southern District of New York, to the seat vacated by Judge Deborah Batts, who assumed senior status on April 13, 2012. His nomination was reported by a voice vote of the Senate Judiciary Committee on June 13, 2013. The Senate confirmed his nomination by voice vote on September 9, 2013. He received his commission on September 10, 2013.

== See also ==
- List of African-American federal judges
- List of African-American jurists
- List of Hispanic and Latino American jurists

Legal offices
Preceded by Deborah Batts	Judge of the United States District Court for the Southern District of New York; 2013–present	Incumbent
