= New York's 28th State Senate district =

American legislative district

Senator
Liz Krueger; D–Upper East Side
- Registration: 54.9% Democratic; 17.4% Republican; 23.4% No party preference
- Demographics: 76% White; 2% Black; 8% Hispanic; 11% Asian
- Population (2017): 316,136
- Registered voters: 238,588

New York's 28th State Senate district is one of 63 districts in the New York State Senate. It has been represented by Democrat Liz Krueger since 2002.

== Geography ==
The boundaries of District 28 include much of the Upper East Side of Manhattan and Midtown, but also include parts of Gramercy and Murray Hill. At only 3 square miles, it is the smallest State Senate district in New York.

The district is located entirely New York's 12th congressional district, and overlaps with the 66th, 68th, 73rd, 74th, 75th, and 76th districts of the New York State Assembly.

== Recent election results ==
=== 2026 ===
2026 New York State Senate election, District 28
Party	Candidate	Votes	%
Democratic	Liz Krueger (incumbent)		
Republican	Alina Bonsell		
Block Mamdani	Alina Bonsell		
Total	Alina Bonsell		
Write-in			
Total votes			100.0

=== 2024 ===
2024 New York State Senate election, District 28
Party	Candidate	Votes	%
Democratic	Liz Krueger (incumbent)	97,851	75.9
Republican	Lou Puliafito	30,881	24.0
Write-in		223	0.1
Total votes		128,955	100.0
Democratic hold			

=== 2022 ===
2022 New York State Senate election, District 28
Party	Candidate	Votes	%
Democratic	Liz Krueger	72,039	
Working Families	Liz Krueger	4,698	
Total	Liz Krueger (incumbent)	76,737	77.5
Republican	Awadhesh Kumar Gupta	22,158	22.4
Write-in		62	0.1
Total votes		98,957	100.0
Democratic hold			

=== 2020 ===
2020 New York State Senate election, District 28
Party	Candidate	Votes	%
Democratic	Liz Krueger	105,441	
Working Families	Liz Krueger	7,668	
Total	Liz Krueger (incumbent)	113,109	78.0
Republican	Mike Zumbluskas	31,224	
Independence	Mike Zumbluskas	664	
Total	Mike Zumbluskas	31,888	21.9
Write-in		100	0.1
Total votes		145,097	100.0
Democratic hold			

=== 2018 ===
2018 New York State Senate election, District 28
Primary election
Party	Candidate	Votes	%
Independence	Peter Holmberg	12	21.4
Write-in		44	78.6
Total votes		56	100.0
General election
Democratic	Liz Krueger	90,487	
Working Families	Liz Krueger	2,793	
Total	Liz Krueger (incumbent)	93,280	81.7
Republican	Peter Holmberg	19,551	
Independence	Peter Holmberg	703	
Stop De Blasio	Peter Holmberg	415	
Reform	Peter Holmberg	94	
Total	Peter Holmberg	20,763	18.2
Write-in		66	0.1
Total votes		114,109	100.0
Democratic hold			

=== 2016 ===
2016 New York State Senate election, District 28
Primary election
Party	Candidate	Votes	%
Women's Equality	Mike Zumbluskas	2	100.0
Write-in		0	0.0
Total votes		2	100.0
General election
Democratic	Liz Krueger	97,885	
Working Families	Liz Krueger	3,232	
Total	Liz Krueger (incumbent)	101,117	74.9
Republican	Mike Zumbluskas	31,612	
Independence	Mike Zumbluskas	989	
Libertarian	Mike Zumbluskas	908	
Women's Equality	Mike Zumbluskas	279	
Total	Mike Zumbluskas	33,788	25.0
Write-in		73	0.1
Total votes		134,978	100.0
Democratic hold			

=== 2014 ===
2014 New York State Senate election, District 28
Primary election
Party	Candidate	Votes	%
Democratic	Liz Krueger (incumbent)	13,001	92.9
Democratic	Shota Baghaturia	973	6.9
Write-in		23	0.2
Total votes		13,997	100.0
General election
Democratic	Liz Krueger	37,794	
Working Families	Liz Krueger	4,300	
Total	Liz Krueger (incumbent)	42,094	73.7
Republican	Mike Zumbluskas	14,160	
Independence	Mike Zumbluskas	783	
Total	Mike Zumbluskas	14,943	26.2
Write-in		57	0.1
Total votes		57,092	100.0
Democratic hold			

=== 2012 ===
2012 New York State Senate election, District 28
Party	Candidate	Votes	%
Democratic	Liz Krueger	81,063	
Working Families	Liz Krueger	2,466	
Total	Liz Krueger (incumbent)	83,529	73.9
Republican	David Paul Garland	14,160	
Independence	David Paul Garland	783	
Total	David Paul Garland	29,403	26.0
Write-in		83	0.1
Total votes		113,015	100.0
Democratic hold			

=== Federal results in District 28 ===
Year	Office	Results
2020	President	Biden 81.7 – 16.7%
2016	President	Clinton 80.5 – 16.5%
2012	President	Obama 69.4 – 29.4%
2012	Senate	Gillibrand 76.4 – 22.4%
