= Robert von Mehren =

American lawyer

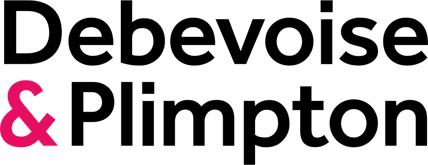
- Debevoise & Plimpton, lifelong firm
- Born: Robert Brandt von Mehren; August 10, 1922; Albert Lea, Minnesota
- Died: May 5, 2016 (aged 93); New York, New York
- Education: Yale University
- Alma mater: Harvard Law School
- Occupation: International arbitration lawyer
- Years active: 1946–1995
- Employer: Debevoise & Plimpton
- Known for: Legal defense of Alger Hiss
- Spouse(s): Mary Katharine Kelly (1948-1985 her death), Susan Heller Anderson (1988-2016 his death)
- Relatives: Arthur T. von Mehren (brother)

Robert Brandt von Mehren (August 22, 1922 – May 5, 2016) was an American lawyer. As a young lawyer in 1949, he participated in the Hiss-Chambers Case, and later became a leading expert in international arbitration in a career spent at the law firm of Debevoise & Plimpton.

== Background ==
Von Mehren was born in Albert Lea, Minnesota. His father was a civil engineer from Denmark; his mother was American.

He won a national scholarship to Yale University and graduated summa cum laude. He then studied at Harvard Law School, where he graduated magna cum laude in February 1946. He also served as president of the Harvard Law Review.

== Career ==
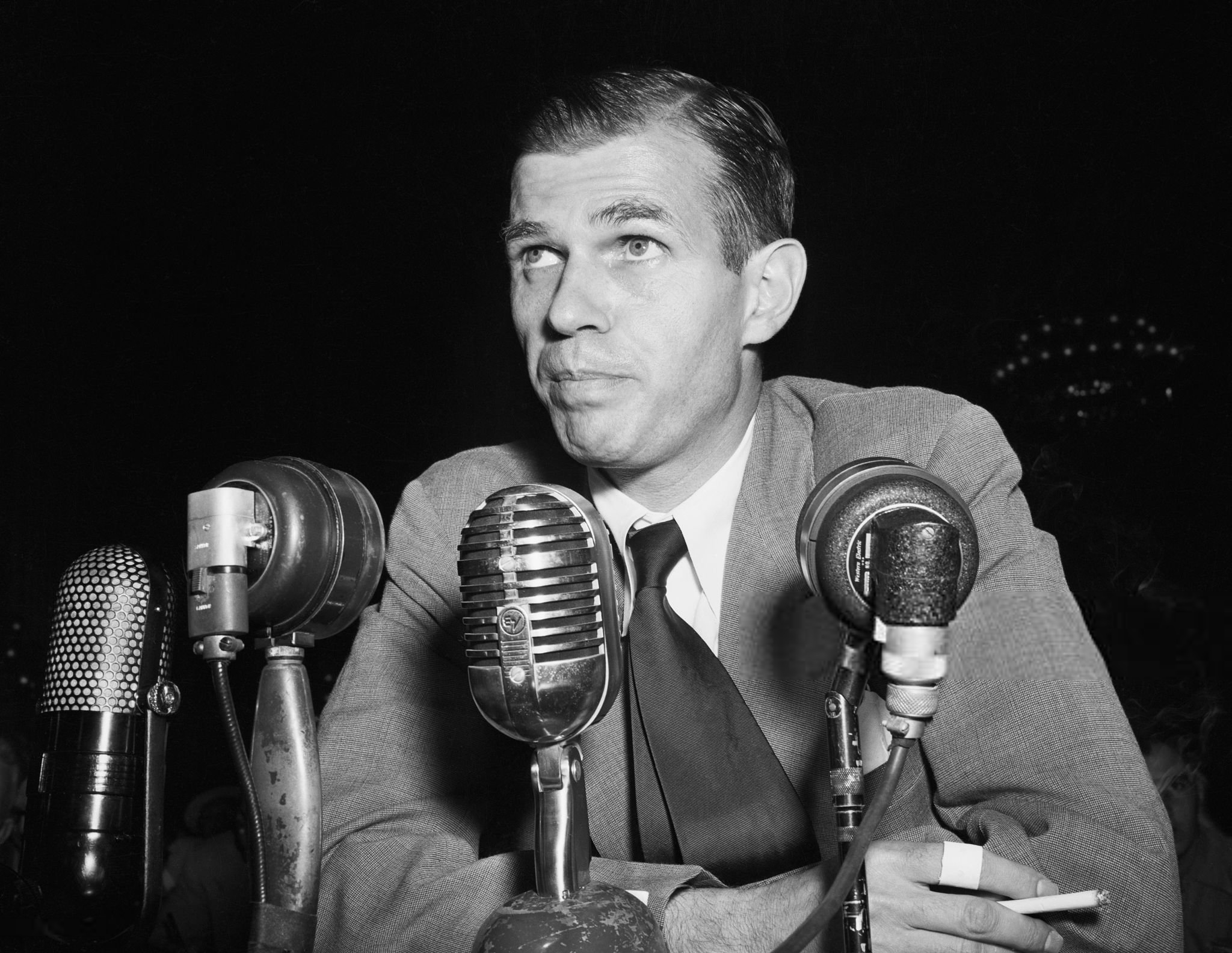
Alger Hiss in 1948

In April 1946, von Mehren joined Debevoise, Plimpton, Lyons and Gates (later Debevoise, Plimpton & McLean; now Debevoise Plimpton), where he worked his entire career.

He clerked for Judge Learned Hand at the Second Circuit Court of Appeals during the October 1946 term and for Supreme Court Justice Stanley F. Reed during the October 1947.

He served on the defense counsel team for Alger Hiss during his two trials for perjury in 1949; the team also included Edward Cochrane McLean, namesake of Debevoise, Plimpton & McLean. He worked on the case from 1948 into 1950, attended every day of the two Hiss trials, and remained in touch with Hiss until the latter's death in 1996. He supported a Scottish law verdict: "not proved."

He became a full member of the firm in April 1957 and remained a partner there up until 1993 (or 1995).

He was admitted to practice before numerous courts: US District Court for the Southern District of New York (1949), US Circuit Courts of Appeal for Second (1950) and Third Circuits (1953), US Supreme Court (1954), US District Court for the Eastern District of New York (1971), US Tax Court (1972), and US Circuit Court of the District of Columbia (1974).

In the Fall of 1957, he served as legal counsel to the Preparatory Commission of the International Atomic Energy Agency and helped composed the agency's guidelines.

He consulted to the Rand Corporation on disarmament (1960–1966) and to the Hudson Institute on international law (1962–1966). He was a senior lecturer in law at the Wharton School.

Pro bono work served: the International Law Association, the Practising Law Institute, the American branch of the International Law Association, committees of the City Bar Association of New York, and the Harvard Law School Association of New York.

He was an honorary member of the Commercial Bar of London and the Singapore Bar. He was also on the board of the American Arbitration Association; a fellow of the American Bar Foundation; the vice-president emeritis of the Axe-Houghton Foundation, and a member of the Council on Foreign Relations, the Century Association and the University Club.

== Personal and death ==
In 1948, von Mehren first married Mary Katharine Kelly (died 1985), who was daughter to physicist Mervin Kelly. In 1988, von Mehren married Susan Heller Anderson, a writer and reporter for the New York Times.

He was an avid sailor and raced on Martha's Vineyard, where he owned a home in Chilmark bought from James Cagney in 1957.

He died at his home in Manhattan from congestive heart failure at age 93. He was survived by wife Susan, and all four of his children

== Works ==
Legal articles written by von Mehren include:

- "The Eco-Swiss Case and International Arbitration" Volume 19 Number 4 Arbitrational International (2003)
- "An International Arbitrator's Point of View: Chapter III", International Business Litigation & Arbitration Practising Law Institute (March 2003)
- "An International Arbitrator's Point of View: Chapter II", International Business Litigation & Arbitration Practising Law Institute (February 2001)
- "An International Arbitrator's Point of View", International Business Litigation & Arbitration 2000 (February 2000)
- "An International Arbitrator's Point of View", International Business Litigation & Arbitration 2000 (February 2000)
- "The Enforcement of International Arbitral Awards," 13.4 Diritto del Commercio, Internazionale 811 (Oct.-Dec. 1999)
- "Enforcement of Foreign Arbitral Awards in the United States", PLI (1998)
- "Book Review, Dealing in Virtue: International Commercial Arbitration and the Construction of a Transactional Legal Order – 8" American Review of International Arbitration, 117 (August 1998)
- "Enforcement of Foreign Arbitral Awards in the United States", Vol. 1, Issue 6, 18, International Arbitration Law Review (Oct. 1998)
- "International Control of Civil Procedure: Who Benefits?", 57, Law and Contemporary Problems (1994)
- "Burden of Proof in International Arbitration", 7, ICCA Congress Series (1994)
- "Arbitration in Central and Eastern Europe: A Practitioner's View", 47, Arbitration Journal (1992)
- "Rules of Arbitral Bodies Considered from a Practical Point of View", 9, Journal of International Arbitration (1992)
- "From Vynior's Case to Mitsubishi: The Future of Arbitration and Public Law", Brooklyn Journal of International Law (1986)* "Extra-Territorial Application of Laws and Responses Thereto", Extra-Territorial Application of Law and Responses Thereto (1984)
- "Points of Disagreement", Harvard Law School Bulletin (Winter 1984)
- "Discovery Abroad: The Perspective of the U.S. Private Practitioner," 16, New York University Journal of International Law and Politics (1984)
- "Transnational Litigation in American Courts: An Overview of Problems and Issues", 3, Dickinson Journal of International Law (1984)
- "Discovery of Documentary and Other Evidence in a Foreign Country: Perspective of the US Private Practitioner", Extra-Territorial Application of Laws and Responses Thereto (1984)
- "The Iran-U.S.A. Arbitral Tribunal", American Journal of Comparative Law(1983)
- "Discovery of Documentary and Other Evidence in a Foreign Country", American Journal of International Law (1983)
- "The Enforcement of Arbitral Awards Under Conventions and United States Law", Yale Journal of World Public Order (April 1983)

== Legacy ==
Papers by or about von Mehren regarding the Hiss Case are available as follows:

- Stanley F. Reed Oral History Project
- Stephen Salant: Successful Strategic Deception
- Alger Hiss Papers

== See also ==
- List of law clerks for the sixth seat of the Supreme Court of the United States
- Debevoise & Plimpton
- Edward Cochrane McLean
- Alger Hiss
- International arbitration
