= Helen Lehman Buttenwieser =

American lawyer

- Born: October 8, 1905
- Died: November 22, 1989 (aged 84)
- Education: Connecticut College (BA); Columbia University; New York University (LLB)
- Spouse: Benjamin Buttenwieser
- Children: Lawrence B. Buttenwieser; Peter L. Buttenwieser; Paul A. Buttenwieser
- Parent(s): Arthur Lehman; Adele Lewisohn
- Family: Lehman family

Helen Lehman Buttenwieser (October 8, 1905 – November 22, 1989) was a 20th-century American lawyer, philanthropist, and later-life legal counselor of Alger Hiss.

== Background ==
Helen Lehman was born on October 8, 1905, to Arthur Lehman and Adele Lewisohn, members of the Jewish Lehman family. Her grandfather, Mayer Lehman, was a co-founder of Lehman Brothers and her uncle was New York State Governor Herbert H. Lehman. She was also a granddaughter of Adolph Lewisohn.

She attended Horace Mann School. In 1923, she graduated from Connecticut College for Women. During the period 1927–1933, she attended the New York School of Social Work and took courses at Columbia University. In 1936, she graduated from New York University Law School.

== Career ==
From 1927 to 1932, she worked as a social worker, including at the Wardell Commission on Social Welfare and the Foster Home Bureau of Hebrew Sheltering Guardian Society. From 1929 to 1945, she served on the board of the Madison Settlement House, and from 1930 to 1935, she served as a commissioner on the New York City Board of Child Welfare.

In 1936, she became the first woman to work at the law firm of Cravath, Swaine & Moore but left after a year because of the impending birth of one of her children. In 1937, she became one of the first women admitted to the New York City Bar Association. Also in 1937, she began a half-century association with the Legal Aid Society (first woman chairman 1979–1983). In 1942, she became a 20-year trustee of the Dalton School. In 1947 (to 1950), she became first chairwoman of a standing committee of the Bar Association of the City of New York. In 1949, she became the first female bank director, as trustee of the Title Guarantee and Trust Company. Also, from 1949 to 1950, she was a member of the civil rights committee of the New York State Bar Association. From 1949 through 1980, she served as a trustee of Connecticut College.

Around 1940, she founded her own law firm, Brennan, London and Buttenwieser. The Jewish CFromld Care Association was a client from 1940 to 1975.

In 1947, she co-founded Beer, Richards, Lane, Haller & Buttenwieser, 1947–1959 Harold Rosenwald (one of the first lawyers to join the Alger Hiss defense team) was a member of the firm.

During the 1950s, other clients were the Leake and Watts Children's Home, Graham Home for Children, and Abbott House. In 1962, she represented alleged Soviet spy Alger Hiss and convicted Soviet spy Robert Soblen. In the 1960s, Martin Garbus in her law firm counseled comedian Lenny Bruce. In 1968, she was admitted to practice before the U.S. Supreme Court. Her legal work focused on aiding women and children (especially adoption, foster care, and child welfare) and preserving civil liberties. She was active in the New York Democratic State Committee, the New York City Bar Association, the New York chapter of the American Civil Liberties Union, and the Legal Defense Fund of the National Association for the Advancement of Colored People.

== Personal and death ==
In 1929, she married Benjamin Buttenwieser, a prominent banker and philanthropist and son of attorney Joseph L. Buttenwieser. She left Cravath after a year because of the impending birth of a child.

She died age 84 of heart failure at New York Hospital on November 22, 1989.

== Awards ==
- 1980: Louis Dembitz Brandeis Medal for Distinguished Legal Service, Brandeis University
- 1983: Legal Aid Society Servant of Justice Award
- 1988: "Roasted" by Association of the Bar of the City of New York
- 1989: Horace Mann Alumni Association Award for Distinguished Service

== Legacy ==
The Helen Lehman Buttenwieser Scholarship and Fellowship at Columbia University is named in her honor.

== See also ==
- Benjamin Buttenwieser
- Walter Beer
- Alger Hiss
- Harold Rosenwald
