= Laemmlein Buttenwieser =

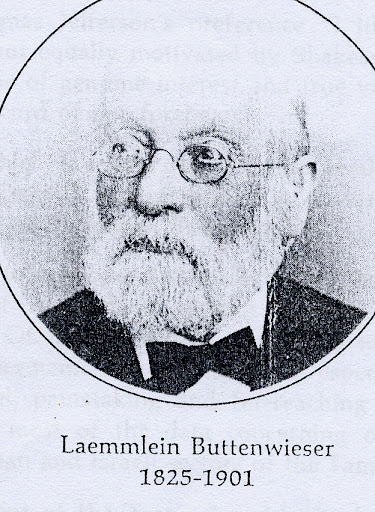
- Born: 16 January 1825; Wassertrüdingen, Bavaria, German Confederation
- Died: 23 September 1901 (aged 76); New York City, New York, United States
- Spouse: Lea Heller (m. 1858)
- Children: Joseph L. Buttenwieser

Laemmlein Buttenwieser (Yiddish: אשר לעמלע בן יוסף אריה בוטענווייזער, romanized: Osher Lemle ben Yosef Aryeh Butenvayzer; January 16, 1825 – September 23, 1901) was a German-born Talmudist, linguist, and educator.

== Biography ==
Buttenwieser was born in Wassertrüdingen, Bavaria on January 16, 1825. He was descended from a long line of rabbis: his father was rabbi of Wassertrüdingen, and his grandfather and great-grandfather were rabbis at Buttenwiesen. He received his education at the gymnasium in Aschaffenburg and at the Universities of Würzburg and Prague, where he also studied for the rabbinate. He received his semikhah from Seligman Baer Bamberger of Würzburg and from Rapoport and Samuel Freund of Prague.

In July 1854, Buttenwieser emigrated to the United States, where he initially worked as a rabbi. However, he did not enjoy this work and instead became a teacher of languages. He taught at the Talmud Yelodim School in Cincinnati and from 1961 worked as an instructor at the Hebrew Education Society of Philadelphia and at the short-lived Maimonides College in that city. In 1873, he moved to New York, where he worked as a private tutor in Hebrew and Talmudic studies. That same year, he was appointed as a teacher of languages in the New York City public schools, a position he held until his retirement in 1886.

He died at his home in New York City on Yom Kippur, September 23, 1901, after a two weeks' illness. He was survived by his wife, two daughters, and one son, Joseph L. Buttenwieser, a successful real estate dealer and broker.
