= Benjamin Buttenwieser =

American banker

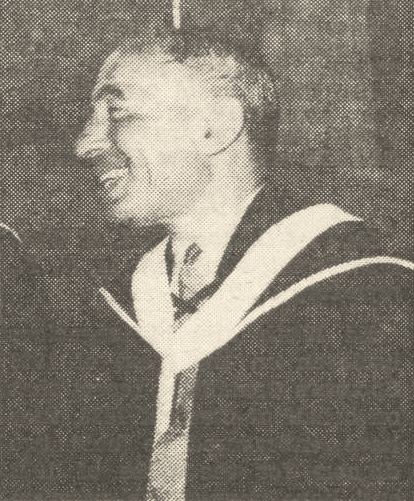
- Buttenwieser in 1960
- Born: Benjamin Joseph Buttenwieser; October 22, 1900; New York City, U.S.
- Died: December 31, 1991 (aged 91); New York City, U.S.
- Other name: Benjamin J. Buttenwieser
- Education: Columbia College
- Occupation: Banker
- Employer: Kuhn, Loeb & Co.
- Spouse: Helen Lehman (m. 1929; died 1989)
- Children: Lawrence B. Buttenwieser; Peter L. Buttenwieser; Paul A. Buttenwieser
- Parent(s): Joseph L. Buttenwieser; Caroline Weil Buttenwieser
- Family: Arthur Lehman (father-in-law)

Benjamin Joseph Buttenwieser (October 22, 1900 – December 31, 1991) was an American banker, philanthropist and civic leader in New York.

== Background ==
Buttenwieser was born to a Jewish family. His father was Joseph L. Buttenwieser. He had an older brother, Lawrence B. Buttenwieser. His family were "our crowd," the top 100 German-Jewish families of New York City.

He entered Columbia College at age 15 and graduated in 1919.

== Career ==
In 1919, Buttenwieser joined the Kuhn, Loeb & Co. banking house, and from 1932 to 1949 was general partner. During World War II, he served in the U.S. Navy (from 1942 to 1945). Buttenwieser, who was fluent in German, was Assistant United States High Commissioner in Occupied Germany for political and economic reconstruction, 1949–51. He was also director of many companies, including Revlon; Benrus Watch; Tischman Realty and others. From 1952, he was a limited partner until 1977, when Kuhn, Loeb & Co. merged with Lehman Brothers.

In 1938, Buttenwieser a two-year term as president of the Federation of Jewish Philanthropies of New York (now United Jewish Appeal-Federation of Jewish Philanthropies of New York), like his father (1920s) and brother (1970s). He also served on the executive committee of the American Jewish Committee. He was a trustee of Lenox Hill Hospital and the New York Philharmonic. He was a governor of the Investment Bankers Association.

== Awards ==
- 1967: Alexander Hamilton Medal (Columbia College, Association of Alumni)
- 1976: Honorary Doctorate (Columbia University)

== Legacy ==
The Buttenwieser Professorship at Columbia University was established in 1958 with a gift to the university from Buttenwieser, a longtime University Trustee and clerk of the Trustees, in honor of his father, Joseph.

== Personal and death ==
In 1929, Buttenwieser married Helen Lehman, the daughter of Arthur Lehman, then senior partner at Lehman Brothers. She was one of the first women admitted to the City Bar Association of New York and in 1979, became the first chairwoman of the Legal Aid Society. The couple had four children: a daughter, Carol Helen Buttenwieser Loeb (1933–55), who died at the age of 22, and three sons, Lawrence B. Buttenwieser, Peter L. Buttenwieser, and Paul A. Buttenwieser.

As Helen L. Buttenwieser, she was an attorney for Alger Hiss. The couple's activism landed Benjamin Buttenwieser on the master list of Nixon political opponents.

He died age 91 of a heart attack on December 31, 1991, at Lenox Hill Hospital in New York City.

== See also ==
- Helen Lehman Buttenwieser
- Kuhn, Loeb & Co.
- Lehman Brothers

== External sources ==
- Trimel, Suzanne (September 9, 1996). Social Scientist Charles Tilly Joins Columbia Faculty.
- The Universal Jewish Encyclopedia, 1940, volume 2, p. 610.
- English, Bella (July 29, 1999). Family Man: Arts patron also champions a tradition of social justice and philanthropy. The Boston Globe
- Harvard Law School: Buttenwieser, Helen L.. Papers of Helen L. Buttenwieser, 1909-1990
