= Kuhn, Loeb & Co. =

1867–1977 American investment bank

Kuhn, Loeb & Co
- Type: Partnership
- Industry: Investment services
- Founded: 1867; 159 years ago
- Defunct: 1977
- Fate: Merged with Lehman Brothers
- Headquarters: New York City, U.S.
- Key people: John M. Schiff; Chairman; Harvey M. Krueger; President and CEO
- Products: Financial services Investment banking Investment management
- Number of employees: 550 (1977)

Kuhn, Loeb & Co. was an American multinational investment bank founded in 1867 by Abraham Kuhn and his brother-in-law Solomon Loeb. Headed from 1885 onwards by Jacob H. Schiff, Loeb's son-in-law, it grew to be one of the most influential investment banks in the late-19th and early-20th centuries, financing America's expanding railways and growth companies, including Western Union and Westinghouse, and thereby becoming the principal rival of J.P. Morgan & Co.

In the years following Schiff's death in 1920, the firm was led by Otto Kahn (died 1934) and Felix Warburg (died 1937), men who had already solidified their roles as Schiff's able successors. However, the firm's fortunes began to fade following the end of World War II in 1945.

The firm lost its independence from the Bulge Bracket in 1977 when it merged with Lehman Brothers, creating Lehman Brothers, Kuhn, Loeb Inc. The combined firm was itself acquired in 1984 by American Express, forming Shearson Lehman/American Express and with that, the "Kuhn, Loeb" name was retired.

== History ==
Abraham Kuhn and Solomon Loeb founded Kuhn, Loeb & Co. as an investment bank in New York City in 1867. Kuhn and Loeb had developed a successful merchandising business in Cincinnati, Ohio, when they decided to move east, to New York, to take advantage of the burgeoning economic expansion of the United States. Company records indicate that by the time Kuhn and Loeb established their partnership, they were able to capitalize it at $500,000 (equivalent of about $11.5 million in 2025). On January 1, 1875, Jacob Schiff (1847–1920), Solomon Loeb's son-in-law, joined the firm. He eventually became its Senior Partner (in office: 1885 to 1920) and grew the firm into the second-most prestigious investment bank in the United States (behind J. Pierpont Morgan's J.P. Morgan & Co.).

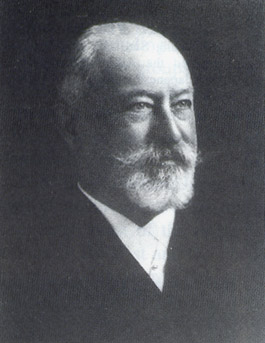
Jacob Schiff

The firm came to prominence during the railroad era in the United States. Americans saw great hope and promise in railroads and investors saw great opportunities to profit. Kuhn, Loeb, like all investment banks, brought capital together with commercial opportunity. Its first meaningful entries into railroad financing occurred in 1877 when it raised funds for the Chicago and North Western Railroad, and several years later, in 1881, for the Pennsylvania Railroad and the Chicago, Milwaukee & St. Paul Railroad.

Schiff was instrumental in the reorganization of the Union Pacific in 1897, helping to place the firm on a sound financial footing. In 1901, with Kuhn, Loeb's financial support, E. H. Harriman famously battled James Jerome Hill and J.P. Morgan to acquire control of the Northern Pacific Railroad.

The firm was long associated with many of America's emerging industrial giants, providing financial backing for Westinghouse and Western Union, as well as for innovative consumer giants like the Polaroid Corporation. The firm also enjoyed respect as a trusted adviser overseas, providing services to numerous foreign countries, including the governments of Austria, Finland, Mexico and Venezuela.

Kuhn, Loeb & Co. also acted as the leading investment house for John D. Rockefeller, through the guidance of his investment adviser, Frederick T. Gates. Rockefeller invested in many syndicates with the bank, taking major stakes in the prominent railroad companies, as well as contributing to its consolidation of the Chicago meatpackers, which resulted in the formation of a leading trust. Overseas ventures that Rockefeller also became involved with included the bank's loans to the Chinese and Imperial Japanese governments.

The firm also joined a partnership with Rockefeller in 1911 to gain control of the Equitable Trust Company, which would later merge and become the Chase Bank.

Famous partners of the firm included Otto Kahn, Paul Warburg, Felix Warburg, Mortimer Schiff, Benjamin Buttenwieser, Abraham Wolff, Lewis Strauss, and Sigmund Warburg, founder of S.G. Warburg.

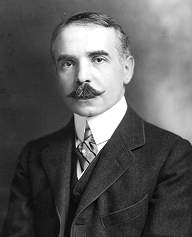
Otto Kahn

In the firm's early years, intermarriage among the German-Jewish élite was common. Consequently, the partners of Kuhn, Loeb were closely related by blood and marriage to the partners of J & W Seligman, Speyer & Co., Goldman, Sachs & Co., Lehman Brothers and other prominent German-Jewish firms. Prior to the Second World War, a particularly close relationship existed between the partners of Kuhn, Loeb and M. M. Warburg & Co. of Hamburg, Germany, through Paul and Felix Warburg, who were Kuhn, Loeb partners. Later on, following World War II, their cousin Sigmund Warburg would briefly continue this relationship as a partner and executive director of the firm.

The firm's fortunes began to fade in the years following World War II. Wall Street began to change, shifting away from relationship banking. Kuhn, Loeb's world of gentlemen-bankers was gradually being replaced by a more aggressive, transaction-oriented Wall Street, with underwriters entering the trenches and selling securities directly to the public — territory which Kuhn, Loeb stubbornly refused to enter. When asked how many people worked at Kuhn, Loeb, one partner famously quipped, "about half". Such was life at Kuhn, Loeb, resting on its laurels, while Wall Street passed it by.

In 1977, facing a capital crisis, the firm succumbed and merged with Lehman Brothers to form Lehman Brothers, Kuhn, Loeb Inc. Internationally, the merged firms were known as Kuhn Loeb Lehman Brothers Inc., in recognition of Kuhn Loeb's superior international reputation.

The merger did not, however, prove to be the panacea to what ailed Kuhn, Loeb. Indeed, as detailed more closely in the Lehman Brothers history, a period of bitter internal strife ended in 1984 when the firm sold itself to Shearson/American Express, itself the product of a recent merger between American Express and Sandy Weill's Shearson Loeb Rhoades. The combined firms then dropped the "Kuhn, Loeb" name and became known as Shearson Lehman/American Express, ending Kuhn, Loeb's almost 120 years on Wall Street.

Later, the combined firm purchased E.F. Hutton, becoming Shearson Lehman Hutton. Ultimately, however, American Express could not make the pieces of its financial-services supermarket work. In 1993, under then newly appointed CEO, Harvey Golub, the firm sold its retail-brokerage operations to Primerica. In 1994, it spun off a beleaguered Lehman Brothers as Lehman Brothers Holdings Inc. in an initial public offering.

Although the "Kuhn, Loeb" name is probably gone forever, the firm's legacy continues. Former Kuhn, Loeb employees remain in senior positions throughout Wall Street, and, until 2008, at Lehman Brothers. Vestiges of the firm survived in the form of Lehman Brothers' extensive fixed-income capabilities, including many of their bond indices, such as the Government/Credit index. This index, originally started in 1973 by Kuhn, Loeb, as the Government/Corporate index, was among the first generation in bond-index data to measure the fixed-income market. It remains the preeminent benchmark in its class.

== Successors ==
The following is an illustration of the company's mergers and its role in later successor firms, notably Lehman Brothers Kuhn Loeb, Shearson Lehman Brothers and later Lehman Brothers (this is not a comprehensive list):

- Shearson Lehman Hutton (merged 1988)
  - Shearson Lehman Brothers (merged 1984)
    - Shearson/American Express (merged 1981)
      - American Express
        (est. 1850)
      - Shearson Loeb Rhoades (acquired 1981)
        - Shearson Hayden Stone (merged 1973)
          - Hayden Stone, Inc. (formerly CBWL-Hayden Stone, merged 1970)
            - Cogan, Berlind, Weill & Levitt
              (formerly Carter, Berlind, Potoma & Weill, est. 1960)
            - Hayden, Stone & Co.
          - Shearson, Hammill & Co.
            (est. 1902)
        - Loeb, Rhoades, Hornblower & Co. (merged 1978)
          - Loeb, Rhoades & Co. (merged 1937)
            - Carl M. Loeb & Co.
              (est. 1931)
            - Rhoades & Company
              (est. 1905)
          - Hornblower, Weeks, Noyes & Trask (merged 1953–1977)
            - Hornblower & Weeks
              (est. 1888)
            - Hemphill, Noyes & Co.
              (est. 1919, acq. 1963)
            - Spencer Trask & Co.
              (est. 1866 as Trask & Brown)
            - Paul H. Davis & Co.
              (est. 1920, acq. 1953)
    - Lehman Brothers Kuhn Loeb (merged 1977)
      - Lehman Brothers
        (est. 1850)
      - Kuhn, Loeb & Co.
        (est. 1867)
      - Abraham & Co.
        (est. 1938, acq. 1975)
  - E. F. Hutton & Co.
    (est. 1904)

== Partners of the Firm ==
=== General Partners ===
- Abraham Kuhn (1867–1887)
- Solomon Loeb^ (1867–1899)
- Samuel Wolff (1867–1872)
- Samuel Kuhn (1868–1869)
- Jacob Netter (1867–1869)
- Jacob H. Schiff^ (1875–1920)
- Abraham Wolff (1875–1900)
- Michael Gernsheim (1875–1881)
- Lewis S. Wolff (1884–1891)
- James Loeb (1894–1901)
- Louis A. Heinsheimer (1894–1909)
- Felix M. Warburg (1897–1937)
- Otto H. Kahn^ (1897–1934)
- Mortimer L. Schiff (1900–1931)
- Paul M. Warburg (1903–1914)
- Jerome J. Hanauer** (1912–1932)
- Gordon Leith (London) (1927–1930)
- George W. Bovenizer (1929–1961)
- Lewis L. Strauss (1929–1946)
- Sir William Wiseman, Bart. (1929–1960)
- John M. Schiff^ (1931 – ?)
- Frederick M. Warburg (1931 – ?)
- Gilbert W. Kahn (1931 – ?)
- Benjamin J. Buttenwieser (1932–1949)
- Hugh Knowlton (1932 – ?)
- Elisha Walker (1933–1950)
- Percy M. Stewart (1941 – ?)
- Robert F. Brown (1941 – ?)
- Robert E. Walker (1949–1958)
- J. Emerson Thors (1949 – ?)
- J. Richardson Dilworth (1952–1958)
- Jonas C. Andersen (1955–1956)
- Sir Siegmund G. Warburg (London) (1956–1964)
- David T. Miralia (1957 – ?)
- Kenneth N. Hall (1956 – ?)
- Henry Necarsulmer (1956–1977)
- Charles J. Ely (1956 – ?)
- Bernard Einhorn (1965–1967)
- Nathaniel Samuels^ (1955–1974)
- Morris H. Wright
- John M. Leonard
- Alvin E. Friedman (1962 – ?)
- John S. Guest (1962 – ?)
- Jerome S. Katzin (1962–1977)
- John T. Monzani (1962–?)
- H. Spottswood White (1962–?)
- Thomas E. Dewey Jr. (1966–1975)
- Andre Istel (1964–1966)
- Harvey M. Krueger^ (1965–1977)
- Anthony M. Lund
- William H. Todd
- Yves-Andres Istel (1966 – ?)
- John K. Libby (1967–1977)
- James H. Manges (1967 – ?)
- David T. Schiff (1967 – ?)
- Sydney S. Netreba (1968 – ?)
- Sidney J. Sauerhaft (1968 – ?)
- Joseph F. Schwartz (1968 – ?)
- John Barry Ryan III (1969 -)
- Edgar R. Koerner (1969 – ?)
- Archie E. Albright (1969 – ?)
- Mark C. Feer (1969–1977)
- W. Richard Bingham (1970 – ?)
- James A. Favia (1970 – ?)
- William M. Kearns Jr. (1970 – ?)
- Norman W. Stewart (1970 – ?)
- Clifford W. Michel (1972 – ?)
- Robert M. Shepard (1973–1977)

** First non-family member to be admitted to the partnership.
^ Indicates status as former managing partner

=== Partnership Summary Data ===
- 67 General Partners
- Longest Serving Partners: Jacob H. Schiff (45 years), Felix M. Warburg (40 years)

== Clients of the Firm ==
- American Smelting and Refining Company
- Anheuser-Busch
- Automatic Data Processing, Inc.
- Bank Leumi
- Bayer
- Bethlehem Steel
- CIT Group
- Chemical Bank
- The Church of Jesus Christ of Latter-Day Saints
- The Dreyfus Corporation
- Eastern Air Lines
- Endicott Johnson Corporation
- Erie Lackawanna Railway
- European Coal and Steel Community (forerunner of the E.U.)
- Ford Foundation
- The Great Atlantic and Pacific Tea Company
- ITT Corporation
- Israel Discount Bank
- Kingdom of Denmark
- Kingdom of Norway
- Ericsson, Sweden
- Metromedia
- Metropolis of Tokyo, Japan
- Power Authority of the State of New York
- RKO
- Republic Aviation
- Republic of Austria
- Republic of Finland
- Republic of Peru
- Republic of the Philippines
- Republic of Venezuela
- Reynolds Metals Company
- Rockwell Manufacturing Company
- Rockwell-Standard Corp.
- Southern Pacific Transportation Company
- Stouffer's
- Uniroyal
- Mexico (United Mexican States)
- Wagner Electric Corporation
- Western Union Telegraph Company
- Westinghouse Electric Corporation

== Operating Entities ==
- Kuhn, Loeb & Co. Incorporated
- Kuhn, Loeb Asia Limited
- Kuhn, Loeb Government Securities Incorporated
- Kuhn, Loeb International Limited

== Office Locations ==
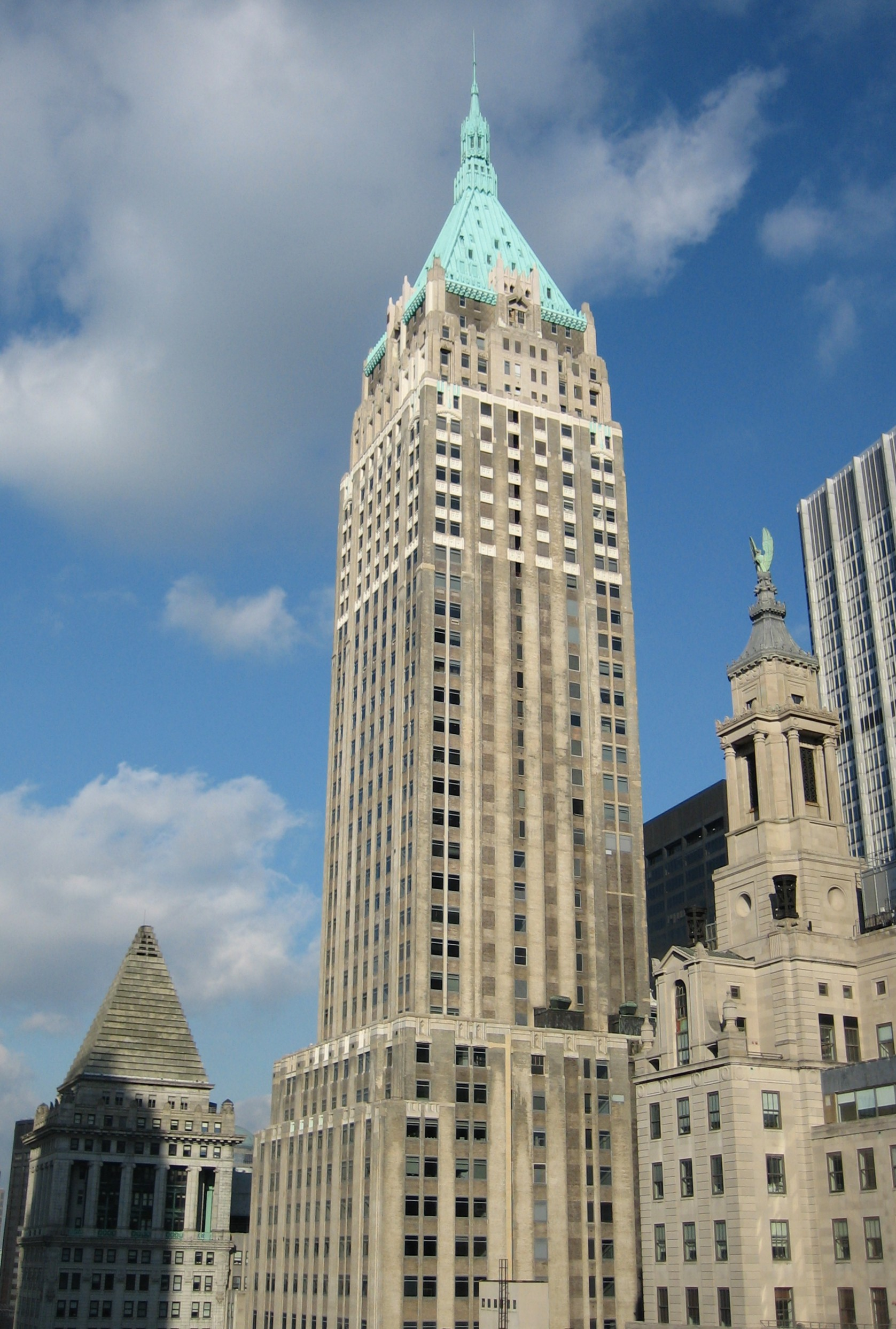
40 Wall Street. The Firm's final pre-Lehman Brothers location

Kuhn, Loeb & Co., had a number of homes throughout its existence:

- 31 Nassau Street, New York, NY (1867)
- 30 Nassau Street, New York, NY (1884)
- 27 Pine Street, New York, NY (1894)
- 52 William Street, New York, NY (1903)
- 30 Wall Street, New York, NY, (May 31, 1955)
- 40 Wall Street, New York, NY
- 55 Water Street (as Lehman Brothers Kuhn Loeb)

== Law Firms Representing Kuhn, Loeb & Co. ==
- Guthrie, Cravath & Henderson L.L.P.
- Dewey, Ballantine, Bushby, Palmer & Wood L.L.P.
