= Charles Simonton =

Charles Simonton may refer to:

- Charles B. Simonton (1838–1911), member of the United States Congress
- Charles Henry Simonton (1829–1904), United States federal judge

== See also ==
- Charles Simonton Moffett (1945–2015), American art curator
