= Frederick Warburg =

Frederick Warburg may refer to:

- Fredric Warburg (1898–1981), British publisher
- Frederick M. Warburg (1897–1973), Jewish-American banker from New York
