= Mary Warburg =

American philanthropist, activist (1908–2009)

Mary Whelan Warburg (née Prue; December 6, 1908 – March 8, 2009) was a philanthropist, member (by marriage) of the Warburg banking family, and younger sister to Edwina d'Erlanger, wife of Baron Leo Frédéric Alfred d'Erlanger (son of Rodolphe d'Erlanger).

== Biography ==
Born in Colorado City, Texas, and raised on her father's sheep ranch near Hope, New Mexico, in the last days of the New Mexico Territory and the early days of statehood, Mary Whelan Prue reportedly fired a shotgun at Pancho Villa as he raided the ranch, but missed him. She was 7 years old. She left school in her early teens and with her elder sister, Edwina, settled in New York City, where they worked as fashion models. Mary was later an assistant fashion editor at Vogue. During World War II, Mary Warburg worked with the Office of the Coordinator of Inter-American Affairs and attended the founding conference of the United Nations in San Francisco in 1945.

== Philanthropy ==
Mary Warburg supported many charitable organizations, including the Henry Street Settlement, the United Negro College Fund, the Institute of International Education; the Association for Homemaker Service (a social welfare agency) and the Hole in the Wall Gang Camps, a network of camps for seriously ill children founded by Paul Newman. She was also long active in Democratic Party circles.

== Personal life ==
She married twice. An early marriage, to Boston artist Richard Currier, ended in divorce in 1936; they had one son, Stephen Currier, the founder of the Council for United Civil Rights Leadership. In 1967, Stephen disappeared with his wife, Audrey Bruce Currier (the daughter of Ailsa Mellon Bruce and David K. E. Bruce) aboard a private plane flying over the Caribbean Sea; their three children survived them. In 1939, she married Edward Mortimer Morris Warburg (the son of banker Felix Warburg and his wife Frieda Schiff, daughter of banker Jacob Henry Schiff). Warburg was a founder of the Jewish Museum; the Museum of Modern Art (MoMA); and the American Ballet, the precursor of the New York City Ballet. They had two children, Daphne and David. Her second husband died in 1992. Her elder sister, with whom she had decamped to New York so many years earlier, Edwina (the widow of Baron Leo d'Erlanger), died in 1994.

Mary Warburg died on March 8, 2009, at age 100 in Norwalk, Connecticut. She was survived by her two children with Warburg: Daphne Warburg (married to Michael Ramon Langhorne Astor, son of Sir John Jacob Astor VII), and David Warburg (married to and divorced from C. Susan MacDonald, later married to journalist Richard Z. Chesnoff). Andrea and Lavinia Currier, director of Passion in the Desert, are her granddaughters from her first marriage.
