= Frieda Schiff Warburg =

Jewish-American philanthropist (1876–1958)

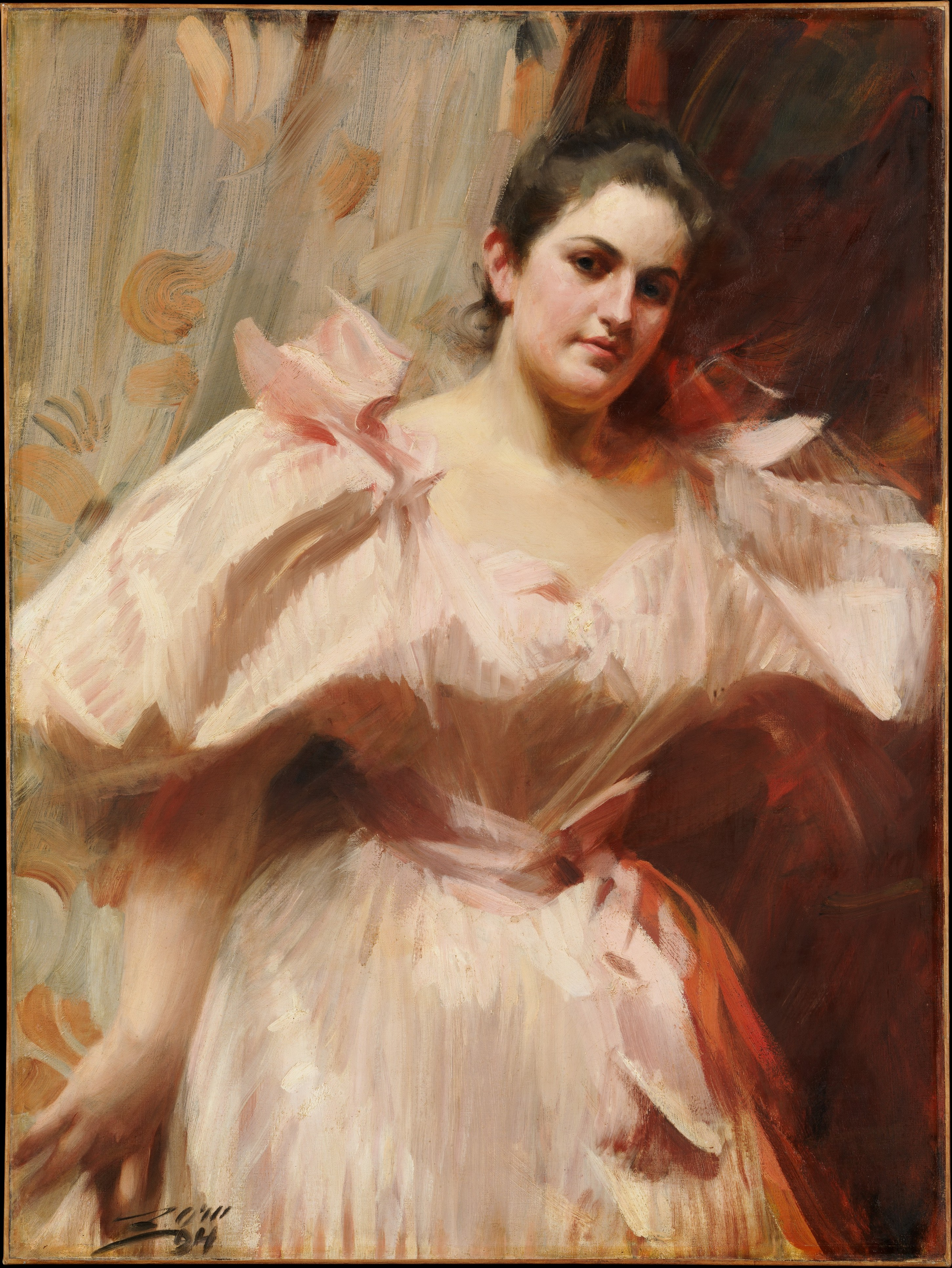
- Portrait Frieda Warburg, by Anders Zorn, 1894, at the Metropolitan Museum of Art
- Born: February 3, 1876; New York City
- Died: September 14, 1958 (aged 82)
- Spouse: Felix M. Warburg
- Parent(s): Jacob Schiff; Therese Loeb

Frieda Warburg (née Schiff; February 3, 1876 – September 14, 1958) was a Jewish-American philanthropist and communal worker from New York.

== Life ==
Warburg was born on February 3, 1876, in New York City, the daughter of Jacob Schiff and Therese Loeb. A member of New York City's German Jewish elite, her father was a preeminent Jewish communal leader and head of the banking firm Kuhn, Loeb & Co., and her maternal grandfather was a founder of the banking firm. She had an opulent private education, although her formal education ended after she graduated from the Brearley School.

Warburg participated with her husband Felix in numerous cultural and philanthropic undertakings he was associated with. Active in interests of her own, she served as president of the Young Women's Hebrew Association from 1928 to 1938. She was active in Hadassah, serving as honorary chairman of the building fund campaign of the Rothschild-Hadassah-University Hospital in Jerusalem. She was also honorary chairman of the Federation for the Support of Jewish Philanthropic Societies of New York City and chairman of the women's division of its 1930 campaign, honorary chairman of the Joint Distribution Committee, and an executive committee member of the Welfare Council of New York City. She regularly donated to various causes, creating a $500,000 fund for the Visiting Nurse Service of New York in 1924 and giving a $90,000 gift to the Jewish Theological Seminary of America to commemorate her father's 90th birthday anniversary in 1937.

Warburg became vice-president of the Jewish Welfare Board in 1937, served as honorary vice-president of the Welfare Council of New York City from 1943 to 1945, and was an honorary president of the American Friends of the Hebrew University and an honorary vice-president of the International Youth Aliyah Committee. She created a $500,000 fund to support the Visiting Nursing Service of New York in 1924, and in 1951 she contributed $650,000 to the UJA for housing and educating new Israeli immigrants to Israel. She became a director of the Jewish Theological Seminary in 1938, like her father, husband, and brother before her. The first (and for much of her tenure only) woman director of the Seminary, she was consulted about their programs for women. In 1944, she donated her husband's mansion on Fifth Avenue to the Seminary. In 1947, they opened the mansion as the Jewish Museum. Warburg and her husband supported development in Israel before and after it became a state.

A patron of the arts, Warburg gifted paintings and etchings to the Metropolitan Museum of Art, Vassar College, the Library of Congress, the National Gallery of Art, the New York Public Library, the Morgan Library, the Mannes College of Music, the Brooklyn Institute of Arts and Science, the Boston Museum of Fine Arts, the Springfield Museum of Fine Arts, Princeton University, New York University, and the Harvard Art Museums. In 1945, she received an honorary Doctor of Humane Letters degree from Hebrew Union College and an honorary L.H.D. degree from the Jewish Theological Seminary, making the first woman to receive an honorary degree from the latter school. In 1952, the Palestine Economic Corporation named her one of the six American builders of Israel. In 1956, the Joint Distribution Committee named a home for the aged in Netanya, Israel after her. She was affiliated with Congregation Emanu-El, politically a Democrat, and a member of the Century Club and the Women's City Club.

In 1895, Warburg married banker and philanthropist Felix M. Warburg of the Warburg family, who became senior partner of her father and grandfather's firm Kuhn, Loeb & Co. Their children were banker Frederick Marcus, cellist Gerald Felix, banker Paul Felix, and philanthropist Edward Mortimer Morris. She also had a daughter Carola, who married Edward M. Rothschild.

In 1956, she donated the 150 acres of her Woodlands estate to the Greenburgh Central 8 school district, forming the school district known today as the Greenburgh Central School District (formerly Greenburgh Central 7).

Warburg died at her home at Meadow Farm on her former estate in Woodlands in White Plains on September 14, 1958.
