= Edward Warburg =

American art collector (1908–1992)

- Born: June 6, 1908; White Plains, New York, U.S.
- Died: September 1992 (aged 84); Norwalk, Connecticut, U.S.
- Education: Middlesex School
- Alma mater: Harvard University
- Spouse: Mary Whelan Prue Currier (m. 1939)
- Children: 2
- Parent(s): Felix M. Warburg; Frieda Schiff
- Relatives: Jacob Schiff (maternal grandfather); James Loeb (great-uncle); Aby Warburg (paternal uncle)

Edward Mortimer Morris Warburg (June 5, 1908 – September 1992) was an American philanthropist and patron of the arts from New York City. He taught Modern Art at Bryn Mawr College and he was vice director for public affairs of the Metropolitan Museum of Art. He was a co-founder of the American Ballet and the School of American Ballet. He collected many paintings and sculptures, and donated the bulk of them to museums, especially the Museum of Modern Art.

== Early life ==
Edward Warburg was born on June 5, 1908, in White Plains, New York, and grew up at the Felix M. Warburg House, a mansion on Fifth Avenue (now home to the Jewish Museum) on the Upper East Side of New York City. He was a son of Frieda (née Schiff) Warburg and Felix Moritz Warburg, a partner of the investment bank Kuhn, Loeb & Co.

His maternal grandfather was Jacob Schiff. His paternal uncle, Aby Warburg, was a German art historian.

Warburg was educated at the Middlesex School, a boarding school in Concord, Massachusetts. He graduated from Harvard University in 1930. While at Harvard, he took courses with Edward W. Forbes and Paul J. Sachs, and co-founded the Harvard Society for Contemporary Art with Lincoln Kirstein and John Walker in 1928. The student organization exhibited the works of the likes of Edward Hopper and Georgia O'Keeffe.

== Career ==
During World War II, Warburg served in Normandy, France, with the United States Army. He was a recipient of the Bronze Star Medal.

Warburg taught Modern Art at Bryn Mawr College, a women's college in Pennsylvania. He served as vice director for public affairs of the Metropolitan Museum of Art in New York City from 1971 to 1974.

Warburg self-published a biography of Sydney S. Spivack in 1981, entitled Sydney S. Spivack (1907-1969).

=== Philanthropy and art collection ===
With his Harvard friend Lincoln Kirstein, Vladmir Dimitriew, and Russian choreographer George Balanchine, Warburg was a co-founder of the School of American Ballet in 1934. Two years later, in 1936, Warburg and Kirstein co-founded the American Ballet, a precursor to the New York City Ballet. Warburg is credited with bringing George Balanchine to the United States. Warburg patronised Balanchine's early ballets in the United States. He also patronised the first Stravinsky Festival at the Metropolitan Opera House, "commissioning the score for Jeu de Cartes."

Warburg joined the board of trustees of the Museum of Modern Art in 1932 serving until 1958. He served on the board of trustees of the Metropolitan Museum of Art from 1988 until his death in 1992.

Over the years, Warburg collected many paintings by Georgia O'Keeffe and Edward Hopper, but also by Pablo Picasso, Henri Matisse, Paul Klee, and Joan Miró. He also collected sculptures by Ernst Barlach, Gaston Lachaise, who sculpted a portrait of him in alabaster, Constantin Brâncuși and Alexander Milne Calder. He donated many of his paintings and sculptures to the Museum of Modern Art in New York City.

Additionally, Warburg donated to Jewish causes. He served as the Chair of the Art division of the UJA-Federation of New York the 1930s. He made charitable contributions to the Tel Aviv Museum of Art and the Habima Theatre in Israel as early as the 1930s. In a 1933 article published by the Jewish Telegraphic Agency, it was explained that he did not "view Palestine as a national homeland but as a university center in which the ideals and culture of the Jewish people may have an opportunity to flourish and spread throughout the whole world."

== Personal life ==
In 1939, Warburg was married to Mary Whelan (née Prue) Currier (1908–2009), known as Mary Warburg. Mary was divorced from Boston artist Richard Currier, an heir to Currier & Ives fortune, with whom she had one son. They resided at 730 Park Avenue. He retired in Wilton, Connecticut. Together, they had a son and a daughter:

- David J. Warburg
- Daphne Warburg (b. 1949), who married Michael Ramon Langhorne Astor (b. 1946), eldest son of Jakie Astor.

Warburg died of heart failure in September 1992 at the Norwalk Hospital in Norwalk, Connecticut.
