= Middlesex School =

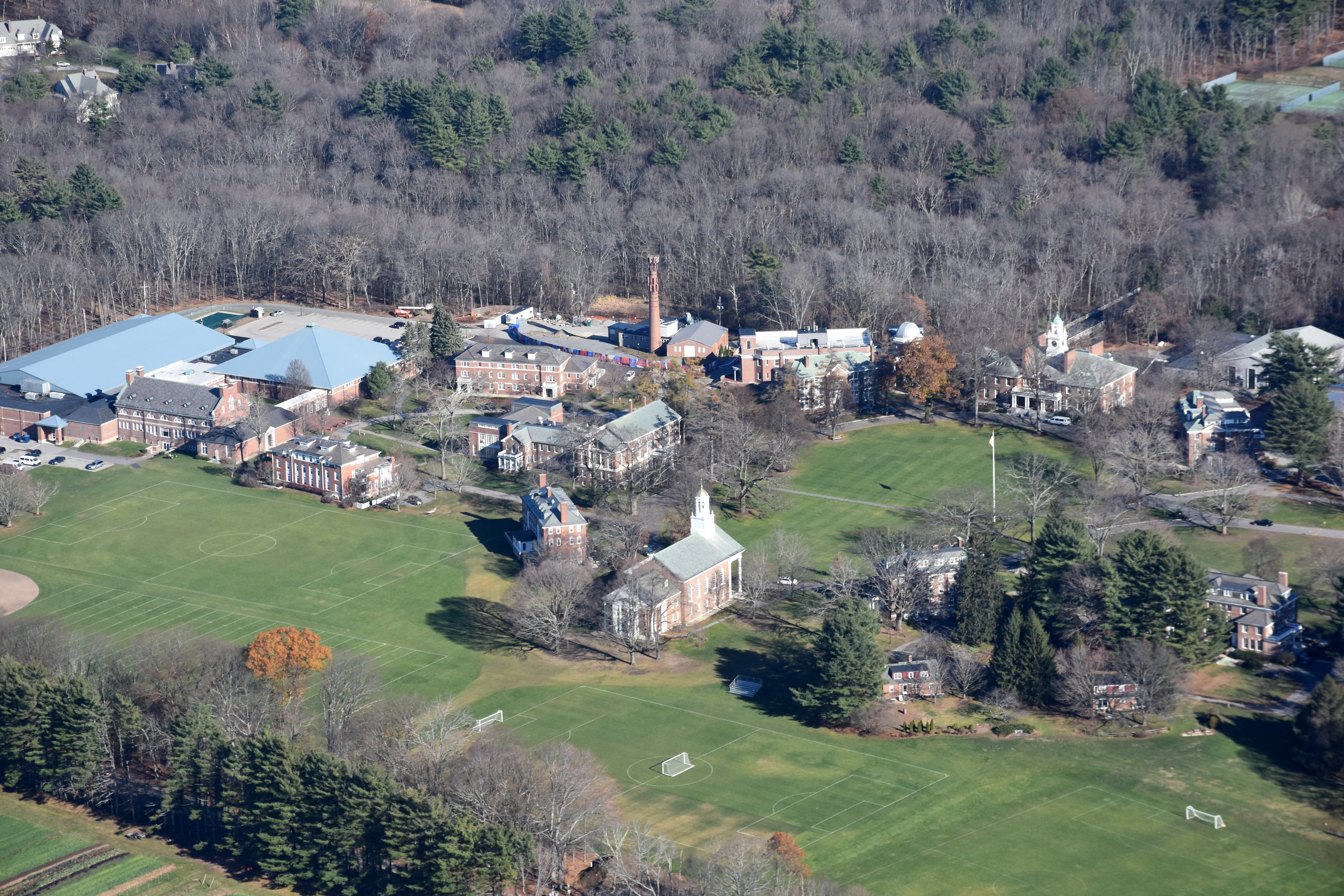
- An aerial view of Middlesex School in November 2015

Location
- 1400 Lowell Road; Concord, Massachusetts 01742; United States; 42°30′2″N 71°22′10″W

Information
- School type: Private, independent, day and boarding, college-preparatory
- Motto: Fides, Veritas, Labor
- Established: 1901; 125 years ago
- Head of school: Elizabeth Speers
- Enrollment: 425
- Average class size: 12
- Student to teacher ratio: 4:1
- Campus size: 350 acres (1.4 km^{2})
- Campus type: Suburban
- Colors: Cardinal and Black
- Athletics conference: Independent School League
- Nickname: Zebras
- Newspaper: The Anvil
- Endowment: $220 million
- Website: mxschool.edu

Middlesex School (informally known as MX) is a coeducational, independent, and non-sectarian boarding secondary school located in Concord, Middlesex County, Massachusetts. Founded in 1901 to educate the children of wealthy Boston Brahmin families, Middlesex introduced a national scholarship program in 1935 and currently educates 425 students in grades 9–12 from 30 U.S. states and 22 countries.

== History ==
Middlesex School was founded in 1901 by Frederick Winsor, a native of Massachusetts who had previously served as the founding headmaster of Gilman School in Baltimore. He was backed by a coterie of wealthy Bostonians, including his brother Robert (the managing partner of the Kidder, Peabody investment bank), Francis Cabot Lowell, Norwood Penrose Hallowell, William Cameron Forbes, Henry Lee Higginson, and Charles Jackson Paine, the latter of whom donated the land for the school's campus.

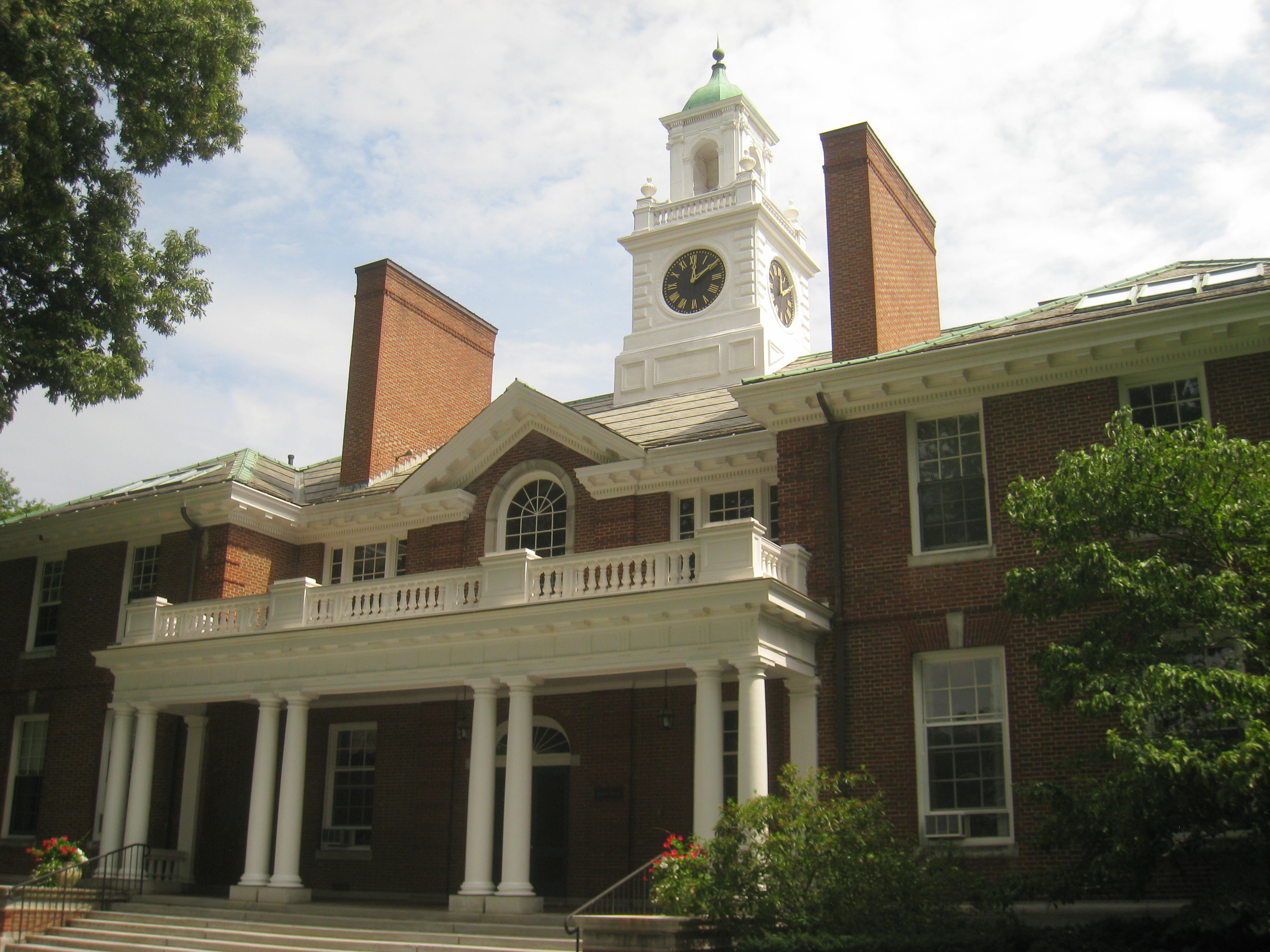
Eliot Hall, one of Middlesex's main administrative buildings, was named after Harvard president Charles William Eliot, an early supporter of the school.

Winsor and his family played a role in the country day school movement. Middlesex masters trained by Winsor went on to establish Belmont Hill School, Boston Country Day School (a predecessor of Rivers School), and Fenn School—three private day schools in Greater Boston. In addition, Winsor's sister Mary founded the Winsor School, an all-girls day school in Boston (though not a country day school). Today, 28% of Middlesex students are day students, a larger percentage than at any of the other St. Grottlesex schools.

A former financial aid student at Harvard College, Winsor introduced a regional scholarship program in 1935, which waived up to two-thirds of tuition and fees for students across the country. The scholarships were explicitly modeled on the scholarship program introduced at Harvard the previous year, and sought to broaden the geographic reach of the student body. Eventually, one-sixth of Middlesex students were recruited through this scholarship program. Today, one-third of Middlesex students are on scholarship, and the student body comes from 32 U.S. states and 20 countries.

Middlesex admitted its first black students in 1964 and its first female students in 1974.

=== Unitarianism and Harvard ===
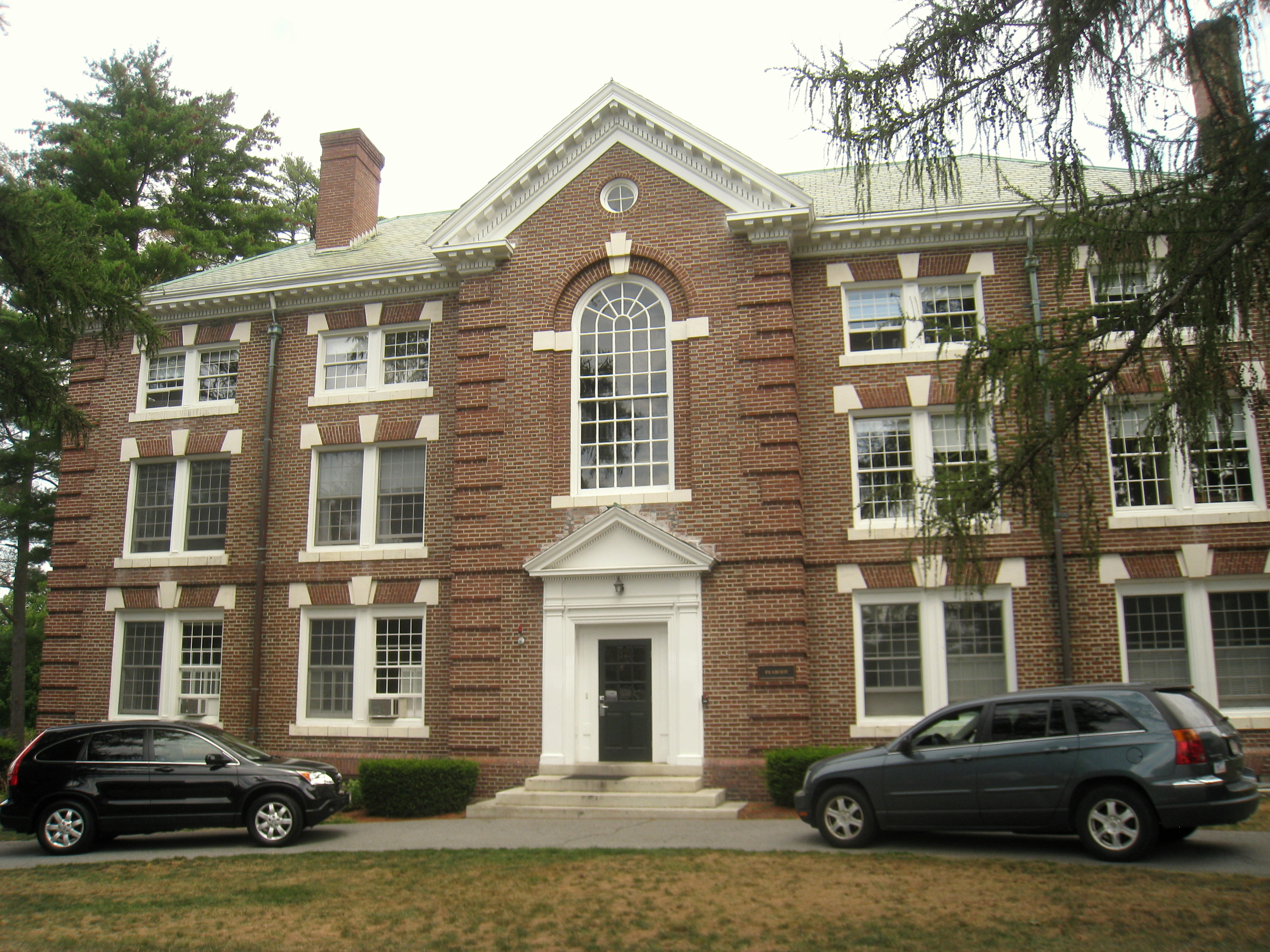
Peabody House, one of the oldest buildings on campus, was donated by a prominent Unitarian family from Salem, Massachusetts.

Middlesex was founded to "meet the needs of the large body of Unitarian parents who [we]re not wholly satisfied to send their boys to the so-called [Episcopal] Church schools" like St. Paul's, St. George's, St. Mark's, and Groton. (Although Groton's founder Endicott Peabody had come from an established Unitarian family, he converted to Episcopalianism in college, to his mother's dismay; his family members donated a Middlesex dormitory.) Although the school has always been nonsectarian, the founding trustees were all Unitarian, and students were required to attend (nonsectarian) on-campus chapel services until the 1960s. Today, Middlesex's chapel hosts secular school meetings on Wednesdays, and there are no regular religious services.

Middlesex's connection to Unitarianism (and Boston's wealthy Boston Brahmin families, many of whom were Unitarians) led to a profitable relationship with Harvard University, which had been unofficially Unitarian since the "Unitarian Controversy" in the early 1800s. Harvard president Charles Eliot (the namesake of a Middlesex administrative building) was an early backer of the school, and Harvard dean LeBaron Russell Briggs was a founding member of the Middlesex board of trustees; both of them were Unitarians. (In fact, at the time Middlesex was founded, Eliot's son Samuel was president of the American Unitarian Association.) Frederick Winsor tailored the Middlesex curriculum to Harvard's entrance requirements and ensured that many of the teachers were Harvard graduates. In 1967, Middlesex placed more students at Harvard, Yale, and Princeton (as a percentage of the graduating class) than all but one New England boarding school. However, Harvard's connection to Unitarianism eroded over time. By 1983, Unitarian Universalists comprised only 28 out of Harvard Divinity School's 380 students.

=== Nonsectarianism and the student body ===
Middlesex is the only nonsectarian member of St. Grottlesex, an informal grouping of five schools historically associated with upper-class White Anglo-Saxon Protestant culture. Its combination of Eastern Establishment prestige and religious permissiveness made it attractive to Jewish, Catholic, and Southern Baptist families who wanted their children to attend an elite boarding school, but not an Episcopalian one. The school did not build an on-campus chapel until 1925, and in the 1940s a proposal to place a Christian altar and cross in the chapel was quietly shelved. (When the 1992 film School Ties was shot at Middlesex, the producers had to supply their own altar and cross, as the school did not have any.)

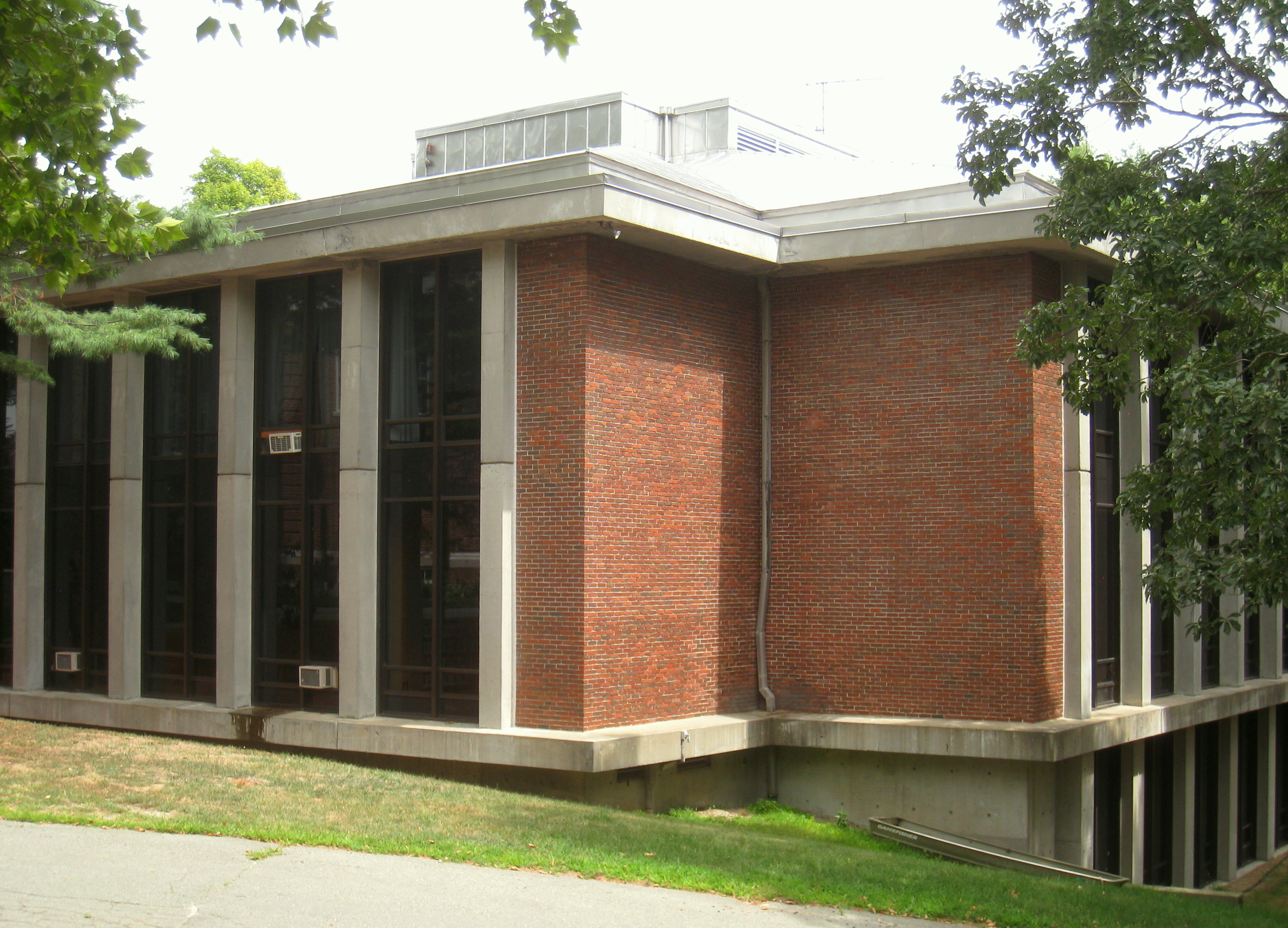
Warburg Library has space for 48,000 books. Frederick M. Warburg '15 chaired the Middlesex board of trustees in the 1950s.

The school developed close ties with several notable Jewish families. Investment banker Jacob Schiff had previously declined to send his son Mortimer to Groton because although Groton would admit Mortimer, it would not excuse him from Sunday chapel. Schiff's daughter married into the Warburg family, and Schiff steered his grandchildren to Middlesex. The Warburgs eventually built the school library, and their Rothschild relatives also patronized Middlesex. (Although Schiff's business partner Otto Kahn did send his son to Groton, Kahn—unlike Schiff—was not religiously observant.)

From the beginning, Middlesex also attracted families from the American South. Due to its financial reliance on white Southern families, Middlesex was one of the last major New England boarding schools to admit black students, doing so in 1964. (Middlesex had admitted its first Asian student in 1938.) After rejecting Booker T. Washington's son in 1902, Frederick Winsor apologetically explained to Washington that "we have the wishes of the parents to consider as well, and we shall have boys next year from as far south as Augusta, Georgia .... Unfortunately for us, our ambition to be something more than a mere local institution[] brings us face to face with the traditions and prejudices of every section of the country."

Today, 32% of Middlesex students identify as people of color and 12% of Middlesex students come from abroad. The current president of the board of trustees is Jason Robart, an African-American who graduated from Middlesex in 1983.

== Campus and facilities ==
Clay Centennial Center

The Middlesex School campus is located in Concord, Massachusetts, about 20 miles outside of Boston. The campus was designed by the Olmsted Brothers architectural firm, and the firm Peabody and Stearns designed most of the main buildings. Most of the campus buildings are located around The Circle, a grassy field at the center of the campus.

Classes are taught in Eliot Hall (the humanities building and administrative center); the Clay Centennial Center (the math and science building); and the Rachel Carson Music and Campus Center. Warburg Library contains 48,000 books, additional classroom space, and the school archives. In addition, the Bass Arts Pavilion contains two theaters, a gallery, and studio spaces for visual arts.

Ware Hall houses the dining hall and student center. Middlesex offers four boys' dormitories (Clay, Landry, Robert Winsor, and Atkins) and five girls' dormitories (Bryant-Payne, Higginson, Hallowell, LeBaron Briggs, and Kravis).

Middlesex's athletic facilities include seven playing fields (five grass and two artificial turf), a wrestling room, a dance studio, a baseball diamond, eight outdoor tennis courts, eight squash courts, two basketball courts, a hockey rink, a boathouse and pond for crew, and a fitness center.

== Finances ==
=== Tuition and financial aid ===
Tuition and fees for the 2024–25 academic year are $75,475 for boarding students and $61,270 for day students. 32% of the student body is on financial aid, and the average aid grant is $56,731. 27% of students receiving financial aid (~8.6% of the student body) have household incomes under $100,000; for these students, the average grant is $66,767.

=== Endowment and expenses ===
Middlesex's financial endowment stands at $220 million. In its Internal Revenue Service filings for the 2021–22 school year, Middlesex reported total assets of $434.6 million, net assets of $357.7 million, investment holdings of $211.2 million, and cash holdings of $16.9 million. Middlesex also reported $33.3 million in program service expenses and $7.2 million in grants (primarily student financial aid).

== Academics ==
=== Curriculum ===
Middlesex has a 4:1 student-teacher ratio, and the average class size is 12. The school offers 23 Advanced Placement classes.

=== Test scores ===
Among students who submitted test scores to colleges, the Class of 2024's average combined SAT score was 1430 and its average combined ACT score was 33. In 2023, 234 students took 695 AP exams and passed 91% of them.

== Extracurriculars ==
=== Athletics ===
Middlesex fields teams in 17 different sports and competes in the Independent School League. The fall sports are football, cross country, volleyball, soccer, and field hockey; the winter sports are wrestling, dance, squash, ice hockey, alpine skiing, and basketball; the spring sports are crew, lacrosse, baseball, tennis, track, and golf.

Middlesex's primary athletic rival is the St. George's School in Middletown, Rhode Island.

=== Community service ===
Middlesex offers several community service programs. Students may help clean up a soup kitchen at Open Table (weekly), serve food and clean at a food pantry at Cor Unum (on long weekends), talk to people at a home for the elderly at Walden House (weekly), visit the elderly at Sunday Visits (special schedule), and help small children learn to skate at Gazebo (special schedule). Every fall, all students participate in a Community Service Day instead of going to classes. Several student Community Service Officers, all seniors, help manage the program.

Juniors may participate in the Youth in Philanthropy Program, which focuses on teaching students the techniques behind philanthropy and provides $10,000 for the students to distribute to worthy causes annually.

Every summer, the school sponsors a community service trip to the Linawo Children's Home in South Africa, where students tour the surrounding area, learn about South African culture and history, and assist in the operation of the shelter.

== Notable alumni ==
- Conrad Aiken – Pulitzer Prize-winning author and poet
- Paget Brewster – actress
- Steve Carell – actor and comedian
- Joseph S. Clark Jr. – former U.S. Senator from Pennsylvania and mayor of Philadelphia
- James L. Halperin – numismatist and author
- William Hurt – Academy Award-winning actor
- Joseph Kahn – Managing editor, The New York Times
- Mark P. Lagon – American political scientist and human rights campaigner
- Mills Lane – Nevada Judge, D.A, TV personality, professional boxing referee
- Henry Cabot Lodge Jr. – former U.S. Senator from Massachusetts and 1960 Republican vice presidential nominee
- Robin Moore – writer
- Charles Coudert Nast, attorney and U.S. Army major general
- Bill Richardson – former Governor of New Mexico and U.S. ambassador to the United Nations
- Bret Stephens – Op-ed columnist, The New York Times
- Cass Sunstein – former head of President Obama's Office of Information and Regulatory Affairs, Robert Walmsley University Professor at Harvard Law School, columnist at Bloomberg Opinion
- Robert Egerton Swartwout – author
- Kevin Systrom – founder of Instagram
- Shunsuke Tsurumi – Japanese philosopher
- Jessica Tuck – actress
- Chris Van Hollen – senator from Maryland.
- William von Meister - Founder of AOL
- Edward Warburg (1908–1992), philanthropist, patron of the arts.
- Frederick M. Warburg – investment banker
- Paul F. Warburg – investment banker
- William Weld – former Governor of Massachusetts, vice presidential candidate
