= Felix M. Warburg House =

Historic house in Manhattan, New York

- U.S. National Register of Historic Places
- New York State Register of Historic Places
- New York City Landmark
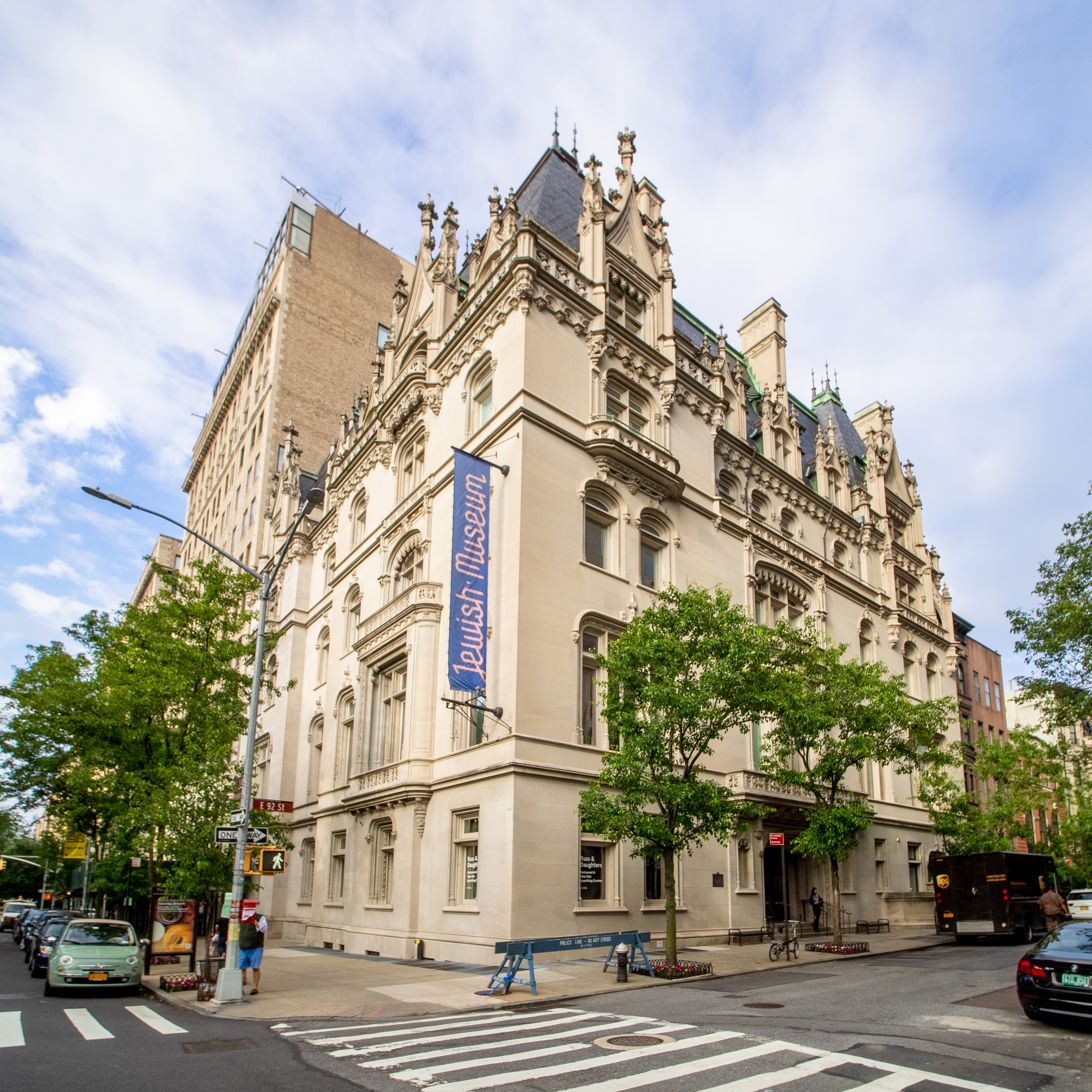
- The Felix M. Warburg House in 2019
- Interactive map of Felix M. Warburg House
- Location: 1109 Fifth Avenue, Manhattan, New York
- Coordinates: 40°47′07″N 73°57′26″W
- Built: 1907–1908
- Architect: C. P. H. Gilbert
- Architectural style: Châteauesque
- NRHP reference No.: 82001207
- NYSRHP No.: 06101.000264
- NYCL No.: 1116

Significant dates
- Added to NRHP: October 29, 1982
- Designated NYSRHP: September 22, 1982
- Designated NYCL: November 24, 1981

The Felix M. Warburg House is a mansion at 1109 Fifth Avenue on the Upper East Side of Manhattan in New York City. The house was built from 1907 to 1908 for the German-American Jewish financier Felix M. Warburg and his family. After Warburg's death in 1937, his widow sold the mansion to a real estate developer. When plans to replace the mansion with luxury apartments fell through, ownership of the house reverted to the Warburgs, who then donated it in 1944 to the Jewish Theological Seminary of America. In 1947, the Seminary opened the Jewish Museum of New York in the mansion. The house was named a New York City designated landmark in 1981 and was added to the National Register of Historic Places in 1982.

The mansion was designed in the Châteauesque style by C. P. H. Gilbert and retains its original facade, characterized by French Gothic details around the windows and on the roof line. In 1993, Kevin Roche constructed an annex to the house in Gilbert's style built with stone from the same quarry that supplied the original mansion, replacing an extension built in 1963. The interior of the Warburg House, wholly occupied by the Jewish Museum, has a total floor space of 82,000 square feet (7,600 m^{2}). Critical reviews of the original house's architecture have generally been positive, while the extensions, from 1963 and 1993, have had mixed receptions.

== Site ==
The Warburg House is located at 1109 Fifth Avenue, on the northeast corner of Fifth Avenue and East 92nd Street, in the Carnegie Hill section of the Upper East Side of Manhattan in New York City. The mansion's lot measures approximately 102 by 100 feet (31 by 30 m). As originally constructed, the house only used 50 feet (15 m) of its Fifth Avenue frontage; the rest was used as a garden. On the block to the south are several mansions, including the Otto H. Kahn House, James A. Burden House, John Henry Hammond House, and John and Caroline Trevor House. The Warburg House was near the north end of Fifth Avenue's Millionaires' Row during the early 20th century, and it is one of numerous buildings on Fifth Avenue's Museum Mile.

== History ==
In 1895, German Jewish banker Felix M. Warburg immigrated to the United States to marry Frieda Schiff, a daughter of Jacob Schiff. In turn, Schiff was the head of the New York–based banking house Kuhn, Loeb & Co., which Warburg had joined as a junior partner in 1897. After their honeymoon, the Warburgs moved into a townhouse at 18 East 72nd Street, a wedding gift to Frieda from her father. The Warburgs had four children by 1907 and, needing space, Frieda purchased a lot at the northeast corner of Fifth Avenue and 92nd Street from Perry Belmont. At the time, the surrounding section of Fifth Avenue was known as "Millionaires' Row" because of its wealthy residents.

=== Private residence ===
To design a new residence on their lot, the Warburgs hired the architect C. P. H. Gilbert, who was at that time building a house for Felix's brother, Paul, and had impressed the family with the mansion he built for Isaac D. Fletcher on Fifth Avenue. In August 1907, Gilbert filed plans for the house, which was to cost $260,000 (equivalent to $9,000,000 in 2025). By the next month, workers were excavating the site, and Gilbert had hired Barr, Thaw & Fraser Co. to supply limestone for the mansion. A. J. Robinson & Co. had been hired as the building's general contractor, and Gilbert was responsible for interior finishes, including furniture. L. Alavoine & Co. and Messrs. William Baumgarten & Co. were awarded the contract for the house's interior decoration in May 1908.

The house was completed in 1908 and used just 50 feet (15 m) of its Fifth Avenue frontage; the rest was used for a lawn. Felix and Frieda moved there with their four children; a fifth child, Edward, was born when the house was completed. According to the 1910 United States census, Frieda and Felix Warburg lived in the house with their five children and 13 servants. The family hosted numerous events at their house. These included the wedding of their daughter Carola in 1916, which was attended by 900 guests; a "dramatic reading" to raise money for World War I relief in 1918; and a fundraiser for Jewish charities in 1928. Frieda took title to the house in January 1924.

On October 20, 1937, Felix Warburg died of a heart attack in the house. Felix had willed all of the possessions and other objects in the Warburg House to Frieda. She remained in the mansion with a son and relatives who had fled Nazi Germany in the 1930s. The house continued to host events such as a meeting of the National Council of Jewish Women in 1938. Rising property tax as a consequence of nearby development greatly strained the Warburgs' finances; by 1941, the city government had appraised the property as being worth $665,000 (equivalent to $14,556,278 in 2025), of which the land was worth $625,000 (equivalent to $12,946,833 in 2023).

Frieda Warburg rented an apartment at 1070 Fifth Avenue in 1940. In May 1941, she sold the mansion to developer Henry Kaufman and architect Emery Roth, who intended to redevelop the site into an eighteen-story apartment building. The New York Herald Tribune reported that the house had been sold for less than $225,000 (equivalent to $4,925,057 in 2025). Roth submitted his plans for an apartment house to the New York City Department of Buildings (DOB) in July 1941. Work on the site had started by July 27, and Roth and Kaufman had begun purchasing steel and other materials for the new building. However, the developers' plans did not progress further, and Frieda took back control of the house.

=== The Jewish Museum ===
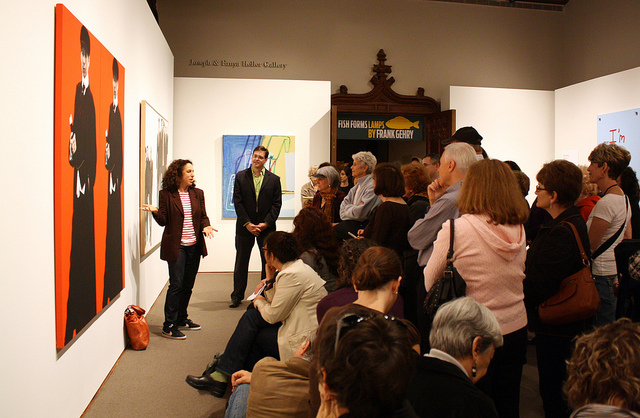
A presentation on feminism in art held at the Jewish Museum in December 2010

On January 14, 1944, Frieda Warburg donated the mansion to the Jewish Theological Seminary of America (JTS), a Conservative Jewish education organization, to commemorate what would have been Felix Warburg's 73rd birthday. She made the donation in memory of her husband, her father, and her brother Mortimer L. Schiff. Percival Goodman was hired to redesign the mansion, and the JTS filed plans with the DOB to convert the building into a museum in September 1944. The renovations were delayed by World War II and, in December 1945, the seminary's president Louis Finkelstein announced that work would start immediately. The first and second stories would each contain two exhibition rooms, while the third story would contain six exhibition rooms. The first story would contain the museum's lobby, and the music room on the second story would be turned into an auditorium. In January 1946, the Sheppard Pollack Company was hired to renovate the house for $100,000 (equivalent to $1,651,024 in 2025).

The JTS opened the Jewish Museum in the mansion in 1947. The museum held a preview of its first exhibit on May 6, 1947, displaying one thousand items on the Warburg House's first two stories. Two days later, the museum formally opened to the general public. Frieda Warburg said that, when she re-entered the house for the first time after its renovation, "I discovered to my joy that instead of depressing me, it gave me a wonderful feeling of happiness." The museum opened a third exhibition in another story of the house in November 1947. In the two years after it relocated to the Warburg House, the museum had 175,000 visitors; by 1952, it had recorded almost half a million cumulative visitors. Adam List designed a sculpture garden next to the museum, which was dedicated in 1959.

The Warburg House's former lawn was replaced with an annex in 1962. Officials laid the cornerstone for the 50-by-70-foot (15 by 21 m) annex on May 20, 1962. The glass annex was designed by Samuel Glaser Associates and was named for philanthropist Albert A. List, who donated $500,000 toward the project (equivalent to $5,321,782 in 2025). The Jewish Museum was temporarily closed for renovations at the end of that month. The project included installing elevators in the Warburg House and a connection to the new annex. The Albert A. List Building opened in February 1963. The wing had 9,000 square feet (840 m^{2}) of space for exhibitions, workshops, and a store. Upon the completion of this wing, the museum's main entrance was relocated to the List Building, and the ground-story windows of the Warburg House were blacked out. During the 1960s, following the completion of the List Building, the museum evolved into an exhibition space for modern art.

==== Preservation ====
In 1970, the New York City Landmarks Preservation Commission (LPC) considered designating the Warburg House a city landmark, which the Jewish Museum successfully opposed. The JTS continued to own the building in the 1970s, even as the seminary discontinued its funding of the museum. By April 1981, however, the LPC was again debating whether to preserve the Warburg House as a city landmark. At the time, the museum wished to replace the List Building with a 25-story tower containing both museum space and apartments, which would require modifications to the Warburg House. The JTS again opposed designation, arguing that it would prevent the museum from modifying the mansion without the LPC's permission and significantly increase the cost of maintenance. According to the Seminary, the museum had an annual deficit of $200,000 (equivalent to $708,272 in 2025), and it needed another $500,000 (equivalent to $1,770,681 in 2025) to perform structural repairs to the Warburg House.

More than 1,000 people signed a petition requesting the LPC grant landmark status to the Warburg House. Manhattan Community Board 8, representing the surrounding neighborhood, voted in November 1981 to recommend that the LPC not designate the building as a landmark. Many local residents did not agree with this decision, and the LPC received over 100 letters supporting landmark protection. On November 24, 1981, the LPC designated the mansion as a city landmark; the designation excluded the List Building. Subsequently, seven local groups and 70 preservationists formed the Alliance to Preserve the Warburg Mansion, which circulated a petition opposing the tower. The New York City Board of Estimate unanimously ratified the designation in April 1982, after the Jewish Museum submitted a modified plan for the tower, but the museum subsequently abandoned its plans for the tower project. The Warburg House was then added to the National Register of Historic Places on October 29, 1982.

==== Expansion ====
Jewish Museum director Joan Rosenbaum and philanthropist Dorothy Rodgers announced in June 1985 that they planned to expand the museum. At the time, the museum had a collection of 14,000 objects, but the Warburg House and the List Building could only accommodate a few hundred objects simultaneously. The museum briefly considered opening a satellite location. These plans were abandoned by May 1988, when Rosenbaum announced that the museum had hired architect Kevin Roche of Roche, Dinkeloo & Associates to design a seven-story annex north of the original building at a projected cost of $17 million. The LPC endorsed plans for the annex, which was to be designed in an identical style to the original mansion.

Construction began in November 1990 and lasted two and a half years. The Jewish Museum agreed to relocate to the New-York Historical Society building for the duration of the project, which ultimately cost $36 million. The work included completely reconstructing the List Building and transforming its interior into a 232-seat auditorium, enlarging the museum's gross floor area from 52,300 to 82,000 square feet (4,860 to 7,620 m^{2}), and moving its main entrance to 92nd Street. The annex was clad with limestone from the quarry that had supplied the original construction. The museum reopened on June 13, 1993.

The museum completed a renovation of its third-floor galleries in January 2018. The renovation, designed by Tsao & McKown Architects, involved removing a staircase and unsealing some windows that faced west toward Central Park. In the mid-2020s, the galleries on the third and fourth floors were renovated as part of a project that was scheduled to be completed in 2025. In addition, a restaurant named Lox opened in the Warburg House in 2024. The Jewish Museum completed a $14.5 million expansion of the Warburg House's third and fourth floors in October 2025, opening the fourth floor to the public for the first time.

== Architecture ==
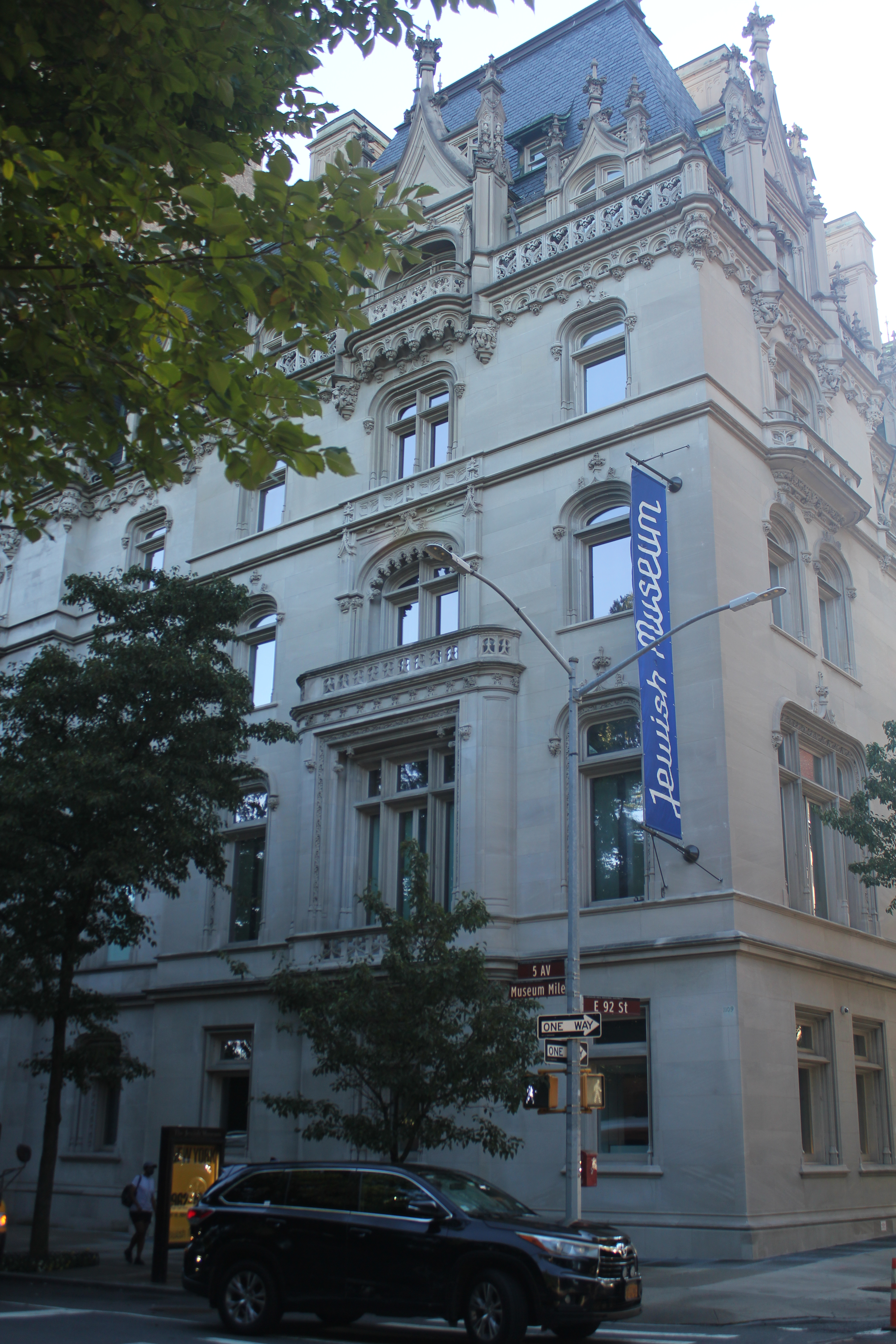
The Warburg House's Fifth Avenue facade

The house was designed and built with six floors and a basement in the Châteauesque style, a choice inspired by the Fletcher House (now Sinclair House) at 2 East 79th Street. As the Warburg House was being constructed, Jacob Schiff unsuccessfully tried to convince the Warburgs to build the house in a more classical Palazzo style, as Schiff thought the Châteauesque style was overly ostentatious. The Warburgs' son Edward Warburg said his grandfather only slightly disapproved of the style, contrary to a popular rumor that held that Schiff thought the ornate design would inspire antisemitism.

=== Facade ===
The exteriors are clad with Indiana limestone. The building has had two facades since 1993, both of which are characterized by a profusion of windows with Gothic ornament. As built in 1908, the 92nd Street elevation of the facade was designed asymmetrically while the Fifth Avenue elevation was symmetrical. On both elevations, the first through fourth stories are clad in limestone. The fifth and sixth stories contain dormer windows that project from a steeply sloped mansard roof, which is clad with slate tiles. The fifth-story windows are surrounded by ornate limestone frames. Art historian E. Wayne Craven noted a similarity of the facade to the Hôtel de Cluny in Paris.

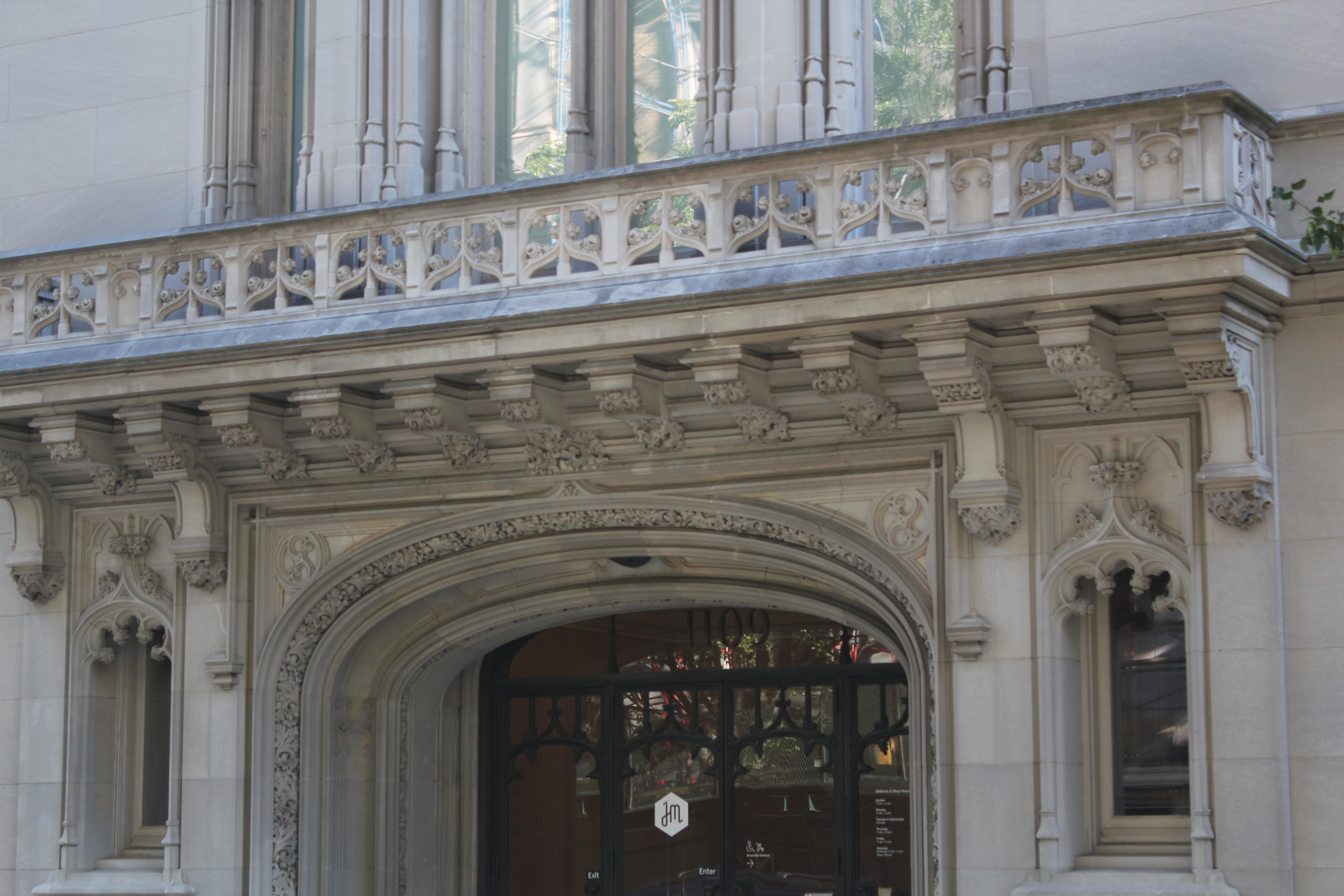
The museum entrance on 92nd Street

The house's main entrance is within a projecting frontispiece on 92nd Street, which contains a depressed elliptical arch at ground level, above which is a balcony with a balustrade. According to the Real Estate Record and Guide, a driveway led from 92nd Street to this frontispiece. From ground level to the top of the second floor, the center of the original Fifth Avenue elevation projects slightly, with balconies on the second and third floors. There are rectangular windows elsewhere on the ground floor, as well as a service entrance on 92nd Street. The fourth floor is recessed at the center and right of the 92nd Street facade. The roof line of the 92nd Street facade is also recessed at its center. The museum's annex, designed by Kevin Roche, imitates the original mansion's style. The facade of the annex on Fifth Avenue measures 50 feet (15 m) wide and is recessed from that of the older structure.

=== Interior ===
==== Original house ====
After entering from 92nd Street, visitors originally passed through a vestibule with an ornamental metal-and-glass screen and door. On the western end of the first floor (facing Central Park), there were two rooms where Warburg displayed etchings and woodcuts on rotating pedestals, in display boxes, and in framed display cases on the walls. There was a grand pipe organ at the rear of the house. Adjacent to the organ, a staircase led to the upper floors. A dumbwaiter in the rear also connected the bedrooms upstairs with the main pantry and serving room downstairs.

A music room, with a pipe organ and grand piano, occupied the second floor. The music room had walls decorated with tapestries; wrought iron chandeliers suspended from beams in the ceiling; a fireplace mantel; and some display cases with rare books. Next to the music room was a sitting room known as the Red Room, which was decorated with Italian paintings and had doors that could slide into the walls. The second floor also contained a formal dining room with tapestries, upholstered chairs, and mantelpiece, along with a Gothic-style conservatory, where a small painting of Madonna with Child by Botticelli was displayed. These rooms were all connected with each other. Breakfast rooms and sitting rooms were placed on the third floor. That story also contained Frieda Warburg's boudoir and bedroom, as well as Felix Warburg's dressing room and bedroom.

The fourth floor contained the bedrooms of the Warburgs' children. A study was placed in the corner of that story, directly above the sitting room, and the fourth-floor hallway contained wind-up toy train tracks. The eastern end of the fourth story contained a nursery, as well as a bedroom for one of the children and nurse. On the fifth floor, there were guests' bedrooms with bathrooms on the western end, as well as a squash court, tea room, and shower with toilet on the eastern end. There were staff bedrooms on the sixth floor. An electric elevator connected all stories between the basement and the sixth floor. Since 1947, these spaces have been part of the Jewish Museum.

==== Annex ====
The Jewish Museum's annex, completed in 1993, contains an auditorium with architectural elements preserved from the mansion. These include a partition screen that was once installed near one of the mansion's staircases, as well as a dome made of stained glass. Other spaces in the annex include design elements, such as columns and moldings, which are similar to the design details in the original building. The annex also contains exhibition galleries, a bookstore, museum offices, and a reception hall. The upper stories contain more offices, as well as a library, study area, and meeting rooms. The furnishings were provided by Ralph Appelbaum Associates.

== Reception ==
In 1909, after the Warburg House was completed, the Real Estate Record and Guide described the building as one of "a number of palatial residences" along Fifth Avenue. Christopher Gray wrote in 2004 that the mansion resembled the Isaac D. Fletcher House, "although it edges toward a simpler expression, with somewhat less detail". After the List Building was completed in 1963, one guidebook characterized the original mansion and the newer building as "a French chateau with a Miami Beach annex". Shortly after the List Building opened, architectural critic Ada Louise Huxtable wrote that the two structures had been "joined in a shotgun architectural marriage, but will never speak to each other architecturally". Huxtable wrote in 1979: "I only wish that the Warburg house didn't seem so unloved." The historian Mosette Broderick wrote in 2022 that, though the Warburg House might have been flashy, it also was reminiscent of Gilbert's earlier Fletcher House on 79th Street.

The 1993 addition, designed by Roche in imitation of Gilbert's style, had a mixed reception. When the plans for the annex were first announced, members of the Municipal Art Society expressed both satisfaction and displeasure over the new design. Some members praised it as a "modest and appropriate" addition complementing the original mansion, but others said the annex was "unimaginative and does nothing to show the evolution of design in our time". The completed work was favorably received by the general public. However, critics noted that while the annex was not distinguishable from the original building, it "lacked depth". Benjamin Forgey of The Washington Post wrote: "This pleasing if unexciting design is surprising mainly because of who did it", since Roche was better known as a modern architect.

== See also ==
- List of Gilded Age mansions
- List of largest houses in the United States
- List of New York City Designated Landmarks in Manhattan from 59th to 110th Streets
- National Register of Historic Places listings in Manhattan from 59th to 110th Streets
