= St. George's School (Rhode Island) =

Episcopal school in Middletown, Rhode Island, US

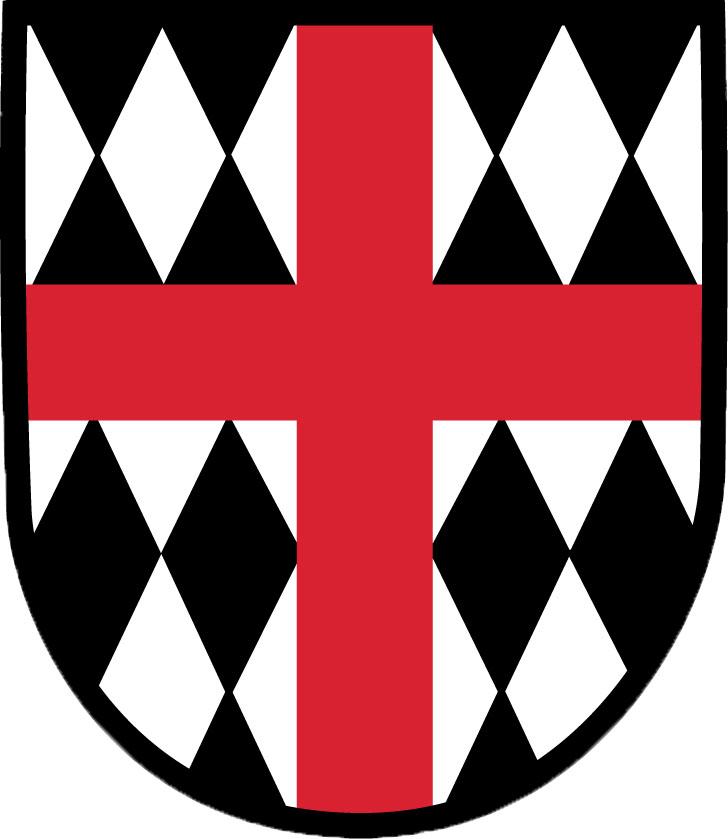

Location
- 372 Purgatory Road; Middletown, Rhode Island 02842; United States; 41°29′28″N 71°16′24″W

Information
- Type: Private secondary, day and boarding
- Motto: Sapientia Utriusque Vitae Lumen ("Wisdom, the light of every life.")
- Denomination: Episcopal
- Established: 1896
- Head of School: Michael Wirtz
- Grades: 9–12
- Gender: Coeducational
- Enrollment: 370
- Campus: Suburban
- Colors: Red, black, and white
- Athletics conference: Independent School League
- Mascot: Dragon
- Rival: Middlesex School
- Newspaper: The Red & White
- Yearbook: The Lance
- Website: stgeorges.edu

St. George's School (nicknamed S.G.) is a private, Episcopal, co-educational day and boarding school in Middletown, Rhode Island, a suburb of Newport. The school is built on a hill overlooking the Atlantic Ocean.

== History ==
=== Early years ===
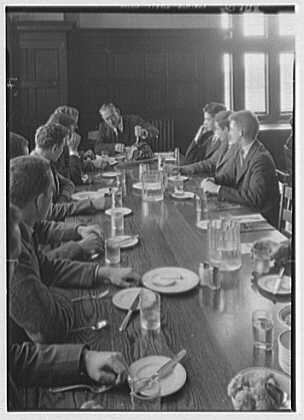
Students at St. George's in 1933

St. George's (originally Diman's School for Small Boys or Mr. Diman's School for Boys) was founded in 1896 by Episcopal minister John Diman. At the time, Rhode Island did not have tax-funded high schools; the state would not require towns to maintain a public high school until 1909. The school initially leased temporary grounds in Newport, but moved across the bay to a permanent campus in Middletown in 1901. The school was initially set up as a for-profit corporation, but became a non-profit corporation in 1903.

Diman modeled his school after the English public schools. He implemented the prefect system and organized the school into six grades, called Forms I-VI in the British fashion. The First and Second Forms were later discontinued in 1930 and 1966.

In 1916, Diman resigned from St. George's; he formally converted to Catholicism the following year. After a spell at Fort Augustus Abbey in Scotland, he returned to Rhode Island and established Portsmouth Abbey School, a Benedictine institution, in 1926.

=== Modern times ===
The school began admitting black students in 1963, female day students in 1971, and female boarders in 1972. In 1987, girls outnumbered boys in the graduating class for the first time.

In the current century, St. George's has focused on redeveloping and renovating its campus. The library was renovated in 2011. A new STEM facility opened in 2015. Memorial Schoolhouse was renovated in 2019–20. The school is currently raising money to grow the endowment, expand student dormitories, and add new faculty housing.

In the 2023–24 school year, St. George's educated 377 students in grades 9–12. 85% of students were boarders. 33% identified as students of color, and 32% received financial aid. 15% of the students were international.

== Finances ==
=== Tuition and financial aid ===
In the 2023–24 school year, St. George's charged boarding students $73,850 and day students $51,275. 32% of St. George's students are on financial aid, which covers, on average, $58,000 for boarders.

=== Endowment and expenses ===
In its Internal Revenue Service filings for the 2021–22 school year, St. George's reported total assets of $310.7 million, net assets of $247.4 million, investment holdings of $208.2 million, and cash holdings of $6.7 million. St. George's also reported $32.1 million in program service expenses and $5.6 million in grants (primarily student financial aid).

== Campus ==
- St. George's School—Church of St. George, Little Chapel, and Memorial Schoolhouse
- U.S. National Register of Historic Places
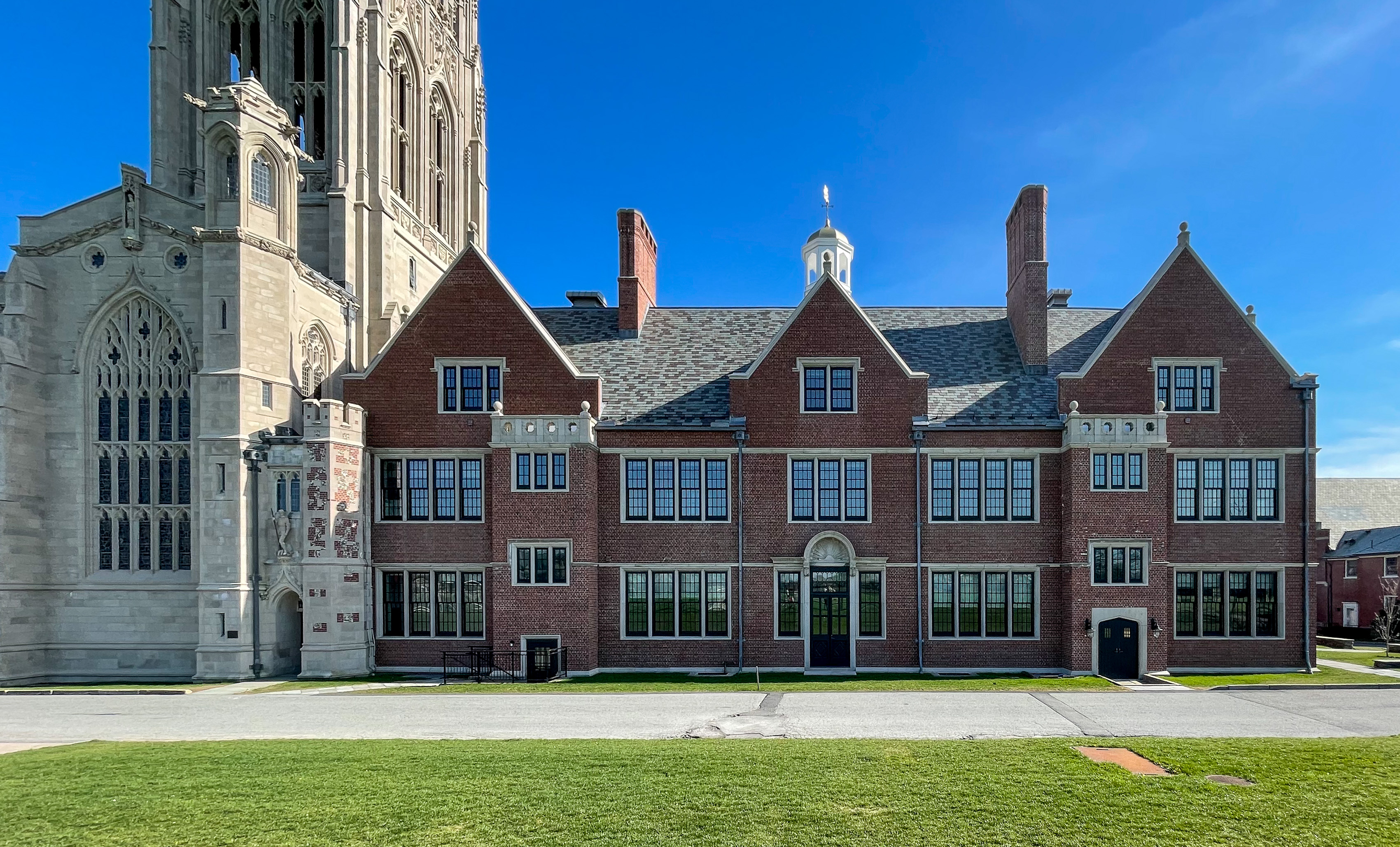
- Memorial Schoolhouse (1923) and the Church of St. George (1928)
- Location: 372 Purgatory Road, Middletown, RI
- Area: less than one acre
- Built: 1909-28
- Architect: Ralph Adams Cram (Church); McKim, Mead & White (Schoolhouse); Clarke, Howe & Homer (Little Chapel)
- Architectural style: Tudor Revival, Late Gothic Revival
- NRHP reference No.: 04001235
- Added to NRHP: November 12, 2004

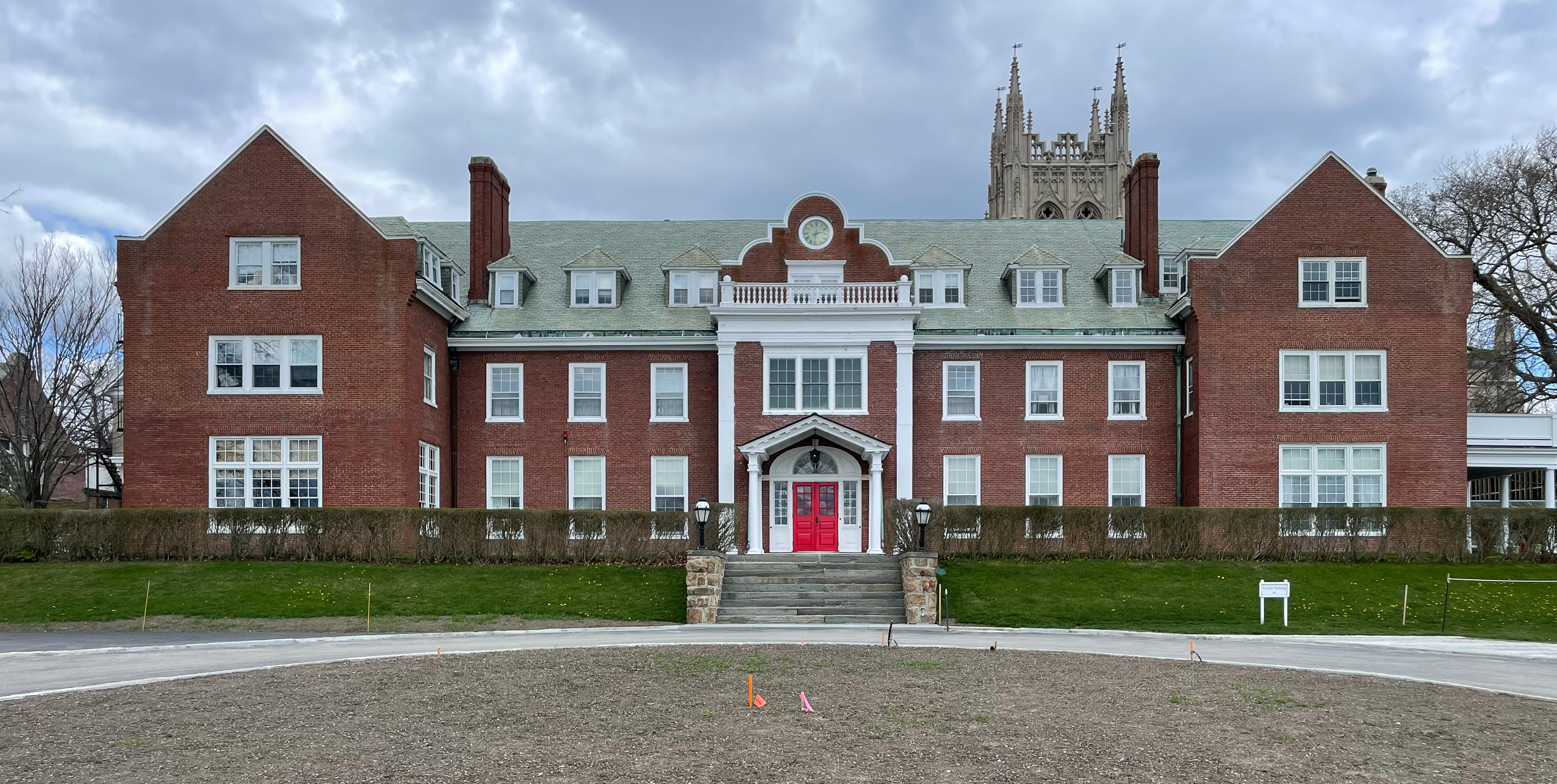
Old School

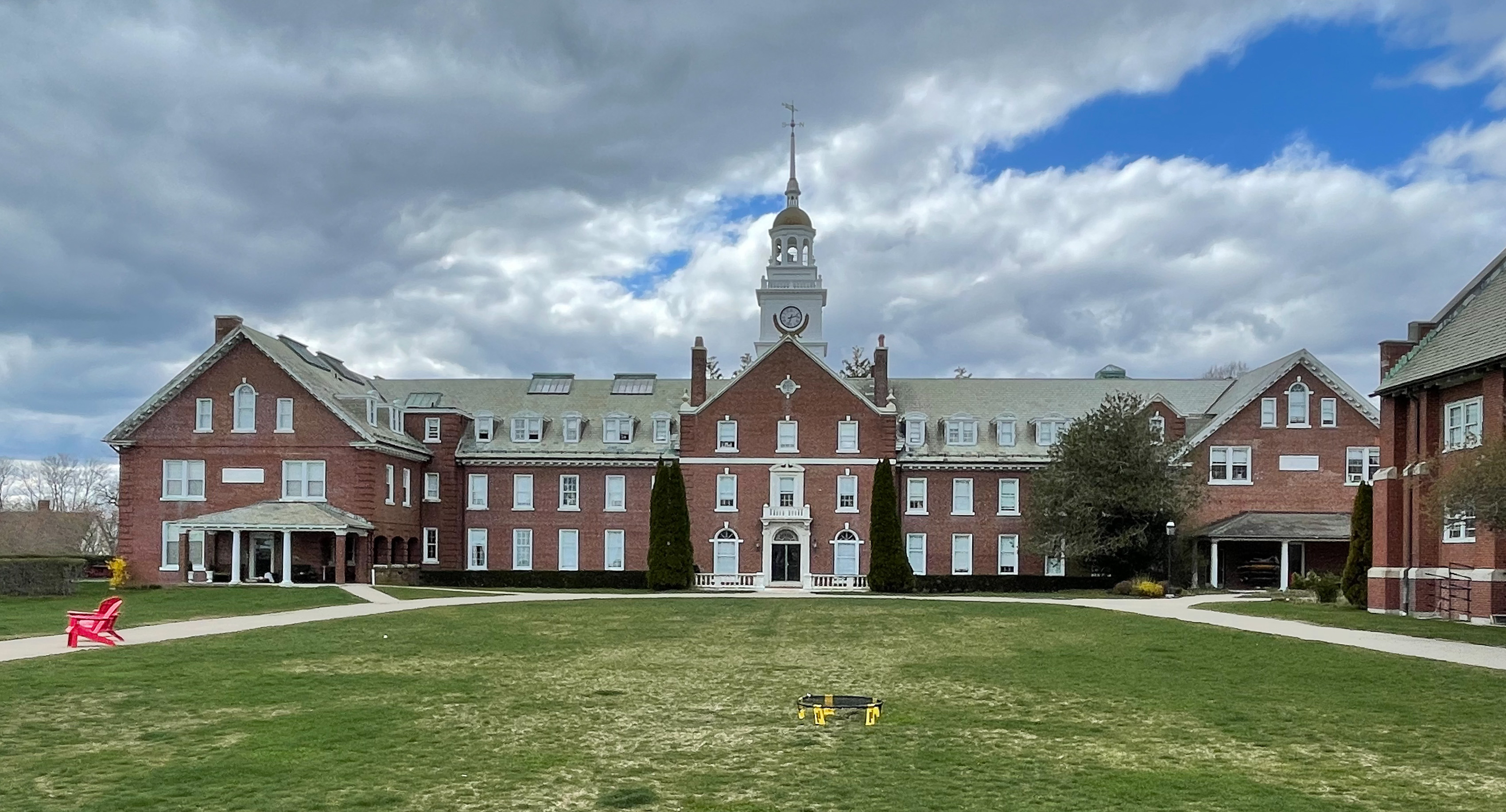
Diman Dormitory

St. George's campus covers 125 acres in southern Rhode Island, overlooking the Atlantic Ocean. The campus was laid out by the Olmsted Brothers architectural firm. In 2004, the school's core buildings were added to the National Register of Historic Places. In 2018, Architectural Digest named St. George's the most beautiful private high school campus in Rhode Island.

St. George's students refer to the campus as "The Hilltop," as it is located on a hill just east of Newport. Outside Middletown, the school is occasionally nicknamed "St. Gorgeous" due to the school's picturesque location (and other factors).

=== Academic facilities ===
- Memorial Schoolhouse (opened 1923, renovated 2020) hosts most classes. It was designed by McKim, Mead & White.
- Academic Center (opened 2015) hosts STEM classes. It contains various sustainable energy facilities, including a wind turbine and a solar-powered water heating system.
- Hill Library (renovated 2011) contains 30,000 volumes and 1,500 reference titles.
- Drury/Grosvenor Center for the Arts (opened 1999) hosts the arts and music departments, a makerspace, and a theater. It is named for two former heads of the St. George's art department.
- John Nicholas Brown '18 Center (opened 2005) hosts administrative offices and the college counseling department. The school intends to demolish this building as part of its broader plans to renovate the central campus.
- Sixth-Form House (built 1903) is the subject of renovation plans. Once renovated, it will host various administrative facilities.

=== Student and religious life ===
- The Church of St. George (commonly referred to as "The Chapel") (opened 1928) was designed by Ralph Adams Cram and donated by alumnus John Nicholas Brown. It contains nine statues by Joseph Coletti.
- The Old Chapel (opened 1911) was St. George's original religious building. It currently hosts music rehearsal facilities.
- King Hall – The school's dining hall.
- Hamblet Campus Center (opened 2004) is named for St. George's 10th headmaster Charles Hamblet and his wife Carol.
- There are five boys' dorms and six girls' dorms. Old School (opened 1901) was the first building on the Middletown campus and currently hosts student residences.

=== Athletic facilities ===
St. George's has ten athletic fields, two hockey rinks, three basketball courts, eight international squash courts, ten tennis courts (six outdoor, four indoor), an indoor track, and an eight-lane swimming pool.

During the summer the squash facility hosts Mark Talbott's Squash Academy, the official training center of the U.S. Squash Racquets Association. It served as the site for both the National Junior Squash Championships in 1996 and 1998, and the Men's Squash Softball Championships in February 1997.

== Extracurricular activities ==
=== Athletics ===
St. George's is a member of the Independent School League (ISL) and the New England Preparatory School Athletic Council (NEPSAC). The school offers 16 sports.

Although the closest ISL team to St. George's is Tabor Academy, St. George's athletics rival is Middlesex School. The schools have played football on a near-annual basis since 1902.

=== School-at-sea program ===
Since 1974, St. George's has offered a school-at-sea program. Currently, the program takes place in Geronimo, a 70-foot fiberglass sloop. Designed by Ted Hood and built in 1998, Geronimo has room for 8 students and 3 crewmen. It hosts three six-week voyages a year, during which St. George's students are schooled in nautical science, oceanography, and marine biology.

== 2015–16 sexual abuse investigation ==
In April 2015, St. George's announced that it had retained a law firm to investigate reports of past sexual abuse by school faculty and staff. The investigator—a partner at the law firm that was St. George's "then-regular outside counsel"—released his 11-page report in December 2015. Several alumni criticized the report, claiming that the investigation was not truly independent. Two weeks after releasing the initial report, the school agreed to commission a second investigation by law firm Foley Hoag.

In September 2016, Foley Hoag released a 390-page investigation report. It found that at least 51 students were victims of sexual misconduct by six St. George's employees; the bulk of the reports dated back to the 1970s and 1980s. (The December 2015 report had mentioned 23 victims and 3 employees.) The investigators concluded that although St. George's "certainly took some concrete steps to protect students"—it fired three (and more likely four) of the six perpetrators—the school failed to timely act on reports of sexual misconduct and continued to recommend one of the perpetrators for other jobs even after firing him for sexual misconduct. Finally, the report confirmed that St. George's currently has "state of the art" programs and policies to address sexual misconduct, bullying, and hazing.

The investigators also highlighted an issue that was colloquially known as the "St. George's loophole": according to Foley Hoag, it was legally ambiguous whether the version of Rhode Island's mandatory reporter law in place at the time required schools like St. George's to report allegations of sexual abuse to law enforcement, and the relevant government agencies had repeatedly claimed that abuse at schools were not within their jurisdiction. In July 2016, the Rhode Island legislature amended the mandatory reporter statute to make it clear that the obligation to report abuse applies to "any public or private school, including boarding schools."

In June 2016, Rhode Island law enforcement declined to file criminal charges against the school. The school reached a financial settlement with a group of former students in August 2016.

== Head of School ==
1. John Diman (1896–1916) - Founder and first headmaster; resigned to later found Portsmouth Abbey School
2. Stephen Perkins Cabot (1917–1926) - Succeeded Diman; oversaw the funding and planning of the iconic school chapel
3. J. Vaughan Merrick III (1928–1943) - Long-serving mid-century headmaster; navigated the school through the Great Depression and early WWII
4. Willet Lawrence Eccles (1943–1950) - Guided the school through the post-WWII era and modernized several academic policies
5. William Ackerman Buell (1951–1961) - Alumnus (Class of 1914) who founded Camp Ramleh; later ordained as an Episcopal priest
6. Archer Harman Jr. (1961–1972) - Championed minority student integration; laid the structural framework to transition into a co-educational campus
7. Anthony Zane (1972–1988) - Oversaw the full transition to co-education; tenure became the focus of the 2016 historical sexual abuse investigation
8. Charles Hamblet (1989–2004) - Long-serving 10th headmaster; the Hamblet Campus Center was named in his honor
9. Eric Peterson (2004–2017) - his administration initiated the comprehensive, independent Foley Hoag inquiry
10. Alixe Callen (2017–2023) - left the Hilltop to become the Head of her alma mater - Milton Academy
11. Michael Wirtz (2023–present) - previously served as Head of School at Hackley School

== Notable alumni ==
- Vincent Astor, philanthropist, majority owner of Newsweek, member of the prominent Astor family
- John Jacob Astor V, philanthropist, owner of The Times
- John Jacob Astor VI, investor, of the Astor family
- Leonard Bacon, class of 1905, well recognized poet, writer, book critic, and winner of the Pulitzer Prize for poetry in 1940
- Livingston L. Biddle Jr., 1936, a descendant of the Philadelphia family, who wrote the legislation that led to the creation of the National Council on the Arts and the National Endowment for the Arts.
- Julie Bowen, 1987, actress best known for playing Claire Dunphy on Modern Family
- John Nicholas Brown, 1918, philanthropist, donor of the school's Chapel, member of the Brown family of Rhode Island, and former Assistant Secretary of the Navy
- Billy Bush, 1990, Access Hollywood anchor and host of the NBC prime-time show Let's Make a Deal and member of the Bush family
- Prescott Bush, 1913, World War I artillery captain, U.S. Senator from Connecticut 1953–1963, father of President George H. W. Bush of the Bush family
- Tucker Carlson, 1987, commentator; former host of Crossfire on CNN, Tucker on MSNBC, and Tucker Carlson Tonight on Fox News
- Peter Cook (American anchor), 1985, Washington anchor for Bloomberg Television
- Philippe Cousteau Jr., 1998, founder of EarthEcho International, grandson of Jacques-Yves Cousteau
- Charles Dean, 1968, brother of Howard Dean, captured and executed in Laos
- Howard Dean MD, 1966, longest-serving Vermont governor 1991–2003, presidential candidate in 2004, and Chairman of the Democratic National Committee 2005–2009
- Kimberly Drew, American art curator and writer
- Philip Drinker, 1911, inventor of the first commercially viable iron lung
- Dede Gardner, President of Plan B Entertainment.
- David Gilbert, 1986, author
- Courtlandt S. Gross, chairman of Lockheed Corporation
- Robert E. Gross, 1915, American aviation businessman, founder and president of the Lockheed Corporation from 1934 to 1956. Featured in the 2004 blockbuster hit The Aviator
- Henry U. Harder, Adjutant General of Vermont.
- William C. Hayes, 1961, leading authority on Egyptian history, and former curator of Egyptian art at the Metropolitan Museum of Art
- Chrissy Houlahan, 1985, U.S. Representative from Pennsylvania
- Frederic Rhinelander King, 1904, architect of the Episcopal Church of the Epiphany, York Avenue and 74th Street in New York City, and the Women's National Republican Club
- Richard Benson - dean of the Yale School of Art from 1996 to 2006
- Laurence G. Leavitt, headmaster of Vermont Academy, Saxtons River, Vermont, for 25 years
- Anthony Mason, 1974, longstanding senior correspondent for CBS News and co-anchor of CBS This Morning
- Charles Simonton Moffett, American art curator and author
- Ogden Nash, 1920, American poet and writer
- Diane Nelson, 1985, president of DC Entertainment from 2009 to 2018, and president and chief content officer of Warner Bros. Interactive Entertainment from 2013 to 2018
- Ivan Sergeyevich Obolensky, publisher and member of the Astor family
- Richard Painter, 1980, Professor of Corporate Law at the University of Minnesota Twin Cities, chief White House ethics lawyer in the George W. Bush administration
- Claiborne Pell, 1936, longest-serving Rhode Island Senator (in office 1961–1997); creator of the Pell Grant
- Adi Shankar, youngest film producer to have a #1 film in the US box office with The Grey.
- Roger W. Straus Jr., co-founder of Farrar, Straus and Giroux, a New York book publishing company
- Ian W. Toll, 1985, American author and historian
- Whitney Tower, longtime horse-racing journalist, and former chairman of the National Museum of Racing and Hall of Fame
- Russell E. Train, 1937, founder and past president of the World Wildlife Fund
- William Henry Vanderbilt III, Governor of Rhode Island, philanthropist
- Harry Werksman, writer-producer for the third season of Grey's Anatomy
- Wilfrid Zogbaum, US avant-garde sculptor
- Tyler Kolek (basketball), 2020, American college basketball player for the Marquette Golden Eagles men's basketball and Big East Conference Men's Basketball Player of the Year in 2023

== In popular culture ==
- In The Official Preppy Handbook, Lisa Birnbach states that the school "place[s] a strong emphasis on the spiritual life."
- The film The Education of Charlie Banks (2007), directed by Fred Durst, was filmed on the St. George's campus. The establishing shots of the Old School building, King Hall, and the chapel were used to represent Vassar College.
- In 2024, commentator Tucker Carlson '87 claimed that the school "wouldn't let me come" visit campus in person. He made this statement during a school-hosted Zoom session with current students. The school responded that Carlson travels with armed bodyguards and state law prohibits carrying guns on school campuses.

== See also ==
- Saint Grottlesex
- National Register of Historic Places listings in Newport County, Rhode Island
