= Felix M. Warburg =

German-born American banker (1871–1937)

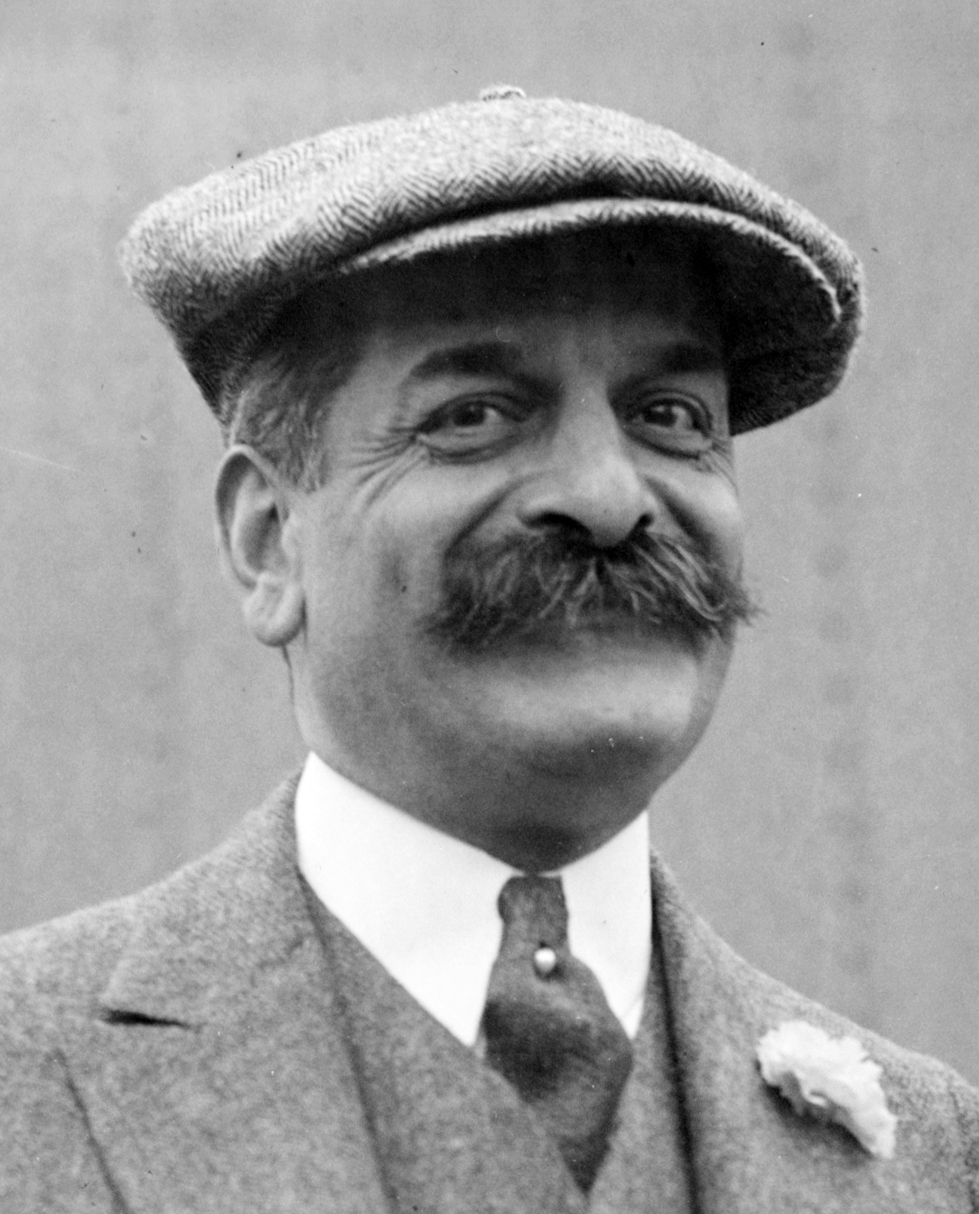
- Warburg circa 1920
- Born: Felix Moritz Warburg; January 14, 1871; Hamburg, Germany
- Died: October 20, 1937 (aged 66); New York City, United States
- Occupation: Banker
- Employer: Kuhn, Loeb & Co.
- Spouse: Frieda Schiff (m. 1895)
- Children: 5

Signature
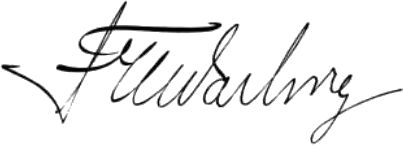

Felix Moritz Warburg (January 14, 1871 – October 20, 1937) was a German-born American banker. He was a member of the Warburg banking family of Hamburg, Germany.

== Early life ==
Warburg was born in Hamburg, in a Jewish family in Germany, on January 14, 1871. He was a grandson of Moses Marcus Warburg, one of the founders of the bank M. M. Warburg (in 1798), and son of Moritz and Charlotte Esther Oppenheim Warburg. Felix's first job at age 16 was in Hamburg, Germany, with N. M. Oppenheim & Co. Felix Warburg was a partner in Kuhn, Loeb & Co.

== Career ==
Warburg was a presidential elector in the 1908 U.S. presidential election.

Warburg was an important leader of the American Jewish Joint Distribution Committee, established to help the Jews in Europe in the period leading up to, and especially during, the Great Depression. Warburg actively raised funds in the United States on behalf of European Jews who faced hunger following World War I. As early as 1919, he was quoted in The New York Times discussing the dire situation of Jewish war sufferers.

Warburg served as the founder and first president of the American Friends of the Hebrew University, which supports the Hebrew University of Jerusalem in Jerusalem, Mandate Palestine, in 1925.

Warburg and the Joint Distribution Committee were also instrumental in the 1930s after the global Great Depression following the crash of the New York Stock Exchange in 1929. More interested in his charitable work than banking, after Hitler seized power, Warburg gave money to help aid Jews fleeing Germany. Before he died, Warburg gave $10,000,000 to Jewish causes around the world.

John L. Spivak claimed General Smedley Butler had named Warburg before Congress as part of the Business Plot.

== Personal life ==
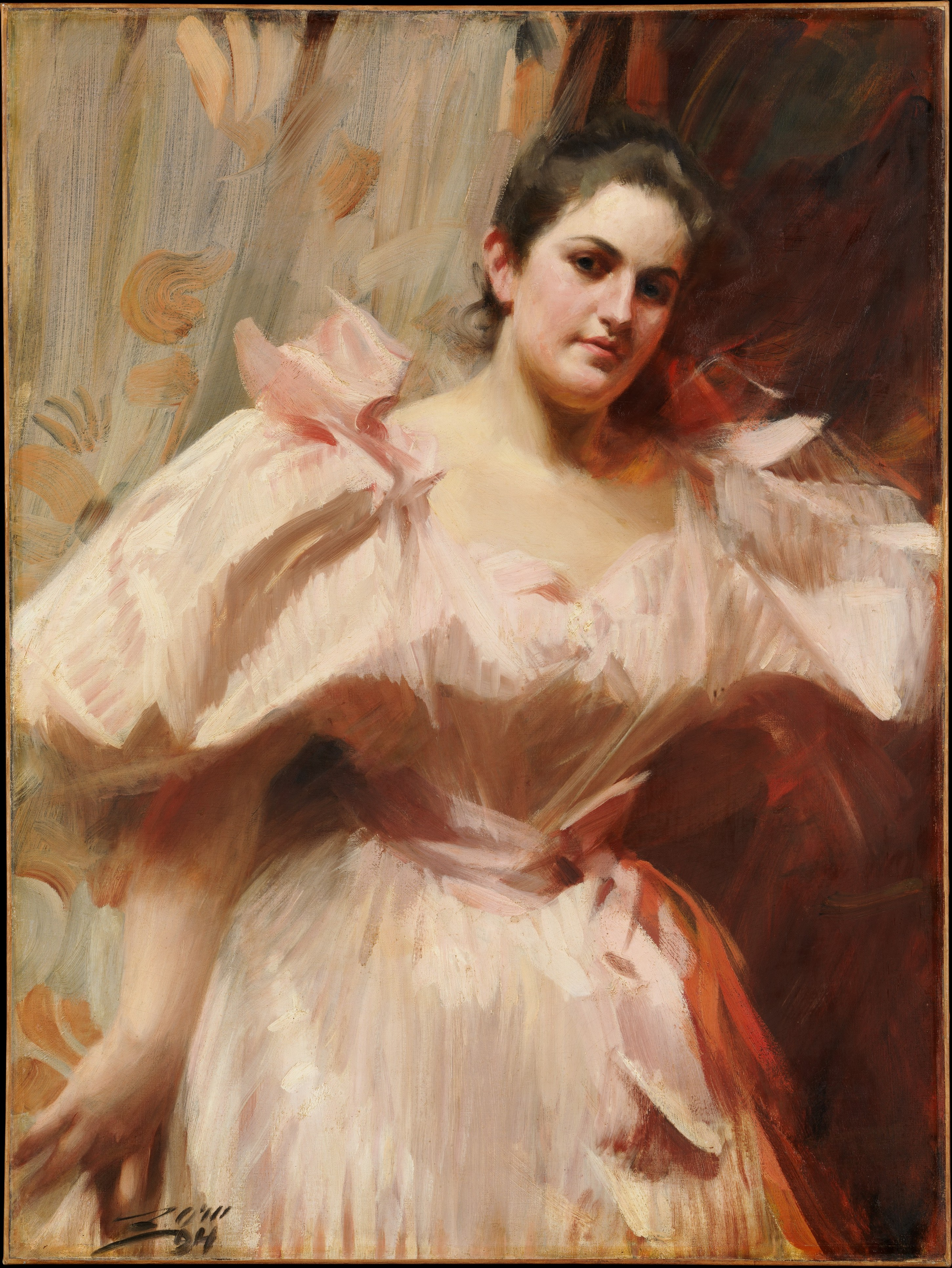
Portrait of his wife, Frieda Schiff, by Anders Zorn, 1894, at the Metropolitan Museum of Art

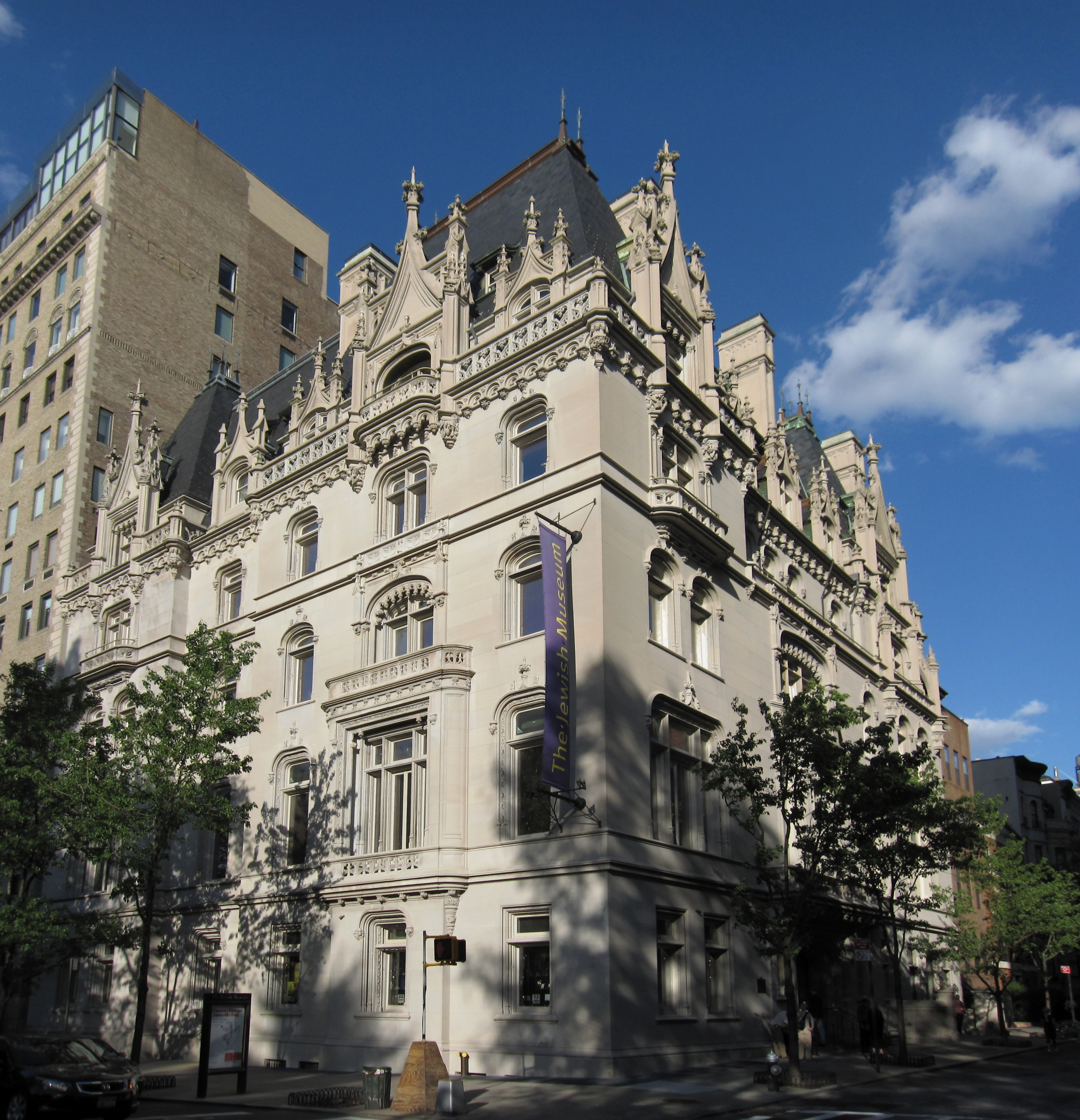
New York City's Felix M. Warburg House, today the Jewish Museum

He married Frieda Schiff (1876–1958), daughter of Jacob Henry Schiff (1847–1920) and Therese Loeb Schiff, on March 19, 1895, in New York. They had four sons and one daughter:

- Carola Warburg Rothschild (1896–1987), married to Walter N. Rothschild, son of Simon F. Rothschild, chairman of the board of Abraham & Straus, and founder of the Federated Department Stores Her daughter, Carol Warburg Rothschild, is the mother of Peter A. Bradford and grandmother of Arthur Bradford.
- Frederick Marcus Warburg (1897–1973), married to Wilma L. Shannon
- Gerald Felix Warburg (1901–1971), married first to Marion Bab and then to Natica Nast, the daughter of Condé Montrose Nast
- Paul Felix Warburg
- Edward Mortimer Morris Warburg (1908–1992), married to Mary Warburg

All of their children were active in community service. In 1927 Warburg purchased and donated four Stradivari instruments for the members of the newly formed Musical Art Quartet (from the Institute of Musical Art, now Juilliard): Sascha Jacobsen, Bernard Ocko, Louis Kaufman, and Marie Roemaet-Rosanov.

He died on October 20, 1937, in New York City. He was buried in Salem Fields Cemetery in Brooklyn.

=== Legacy ===
As a result of his philanthropic activities, a new Jewish village established in Mandate Palestine in 1939, Kfar Warburg, was named after him. He was a trustee of the Jewish Theological Seminary in New York. Warburg also served as president of The 92nd Street Y, then the Young Men's Hebrew Association, from 1908–1916. While president, Warburg donated the Heinsheimer Memorial Annex on 92nd Street, creating The 92nd Street Y's first-ever residence.

The Felix M. Warburg House on New York's Upper East Side was donated by his widow and today houses the Jewish Museum.
