= Paul F. Warburg =

American banker (1904–1965)

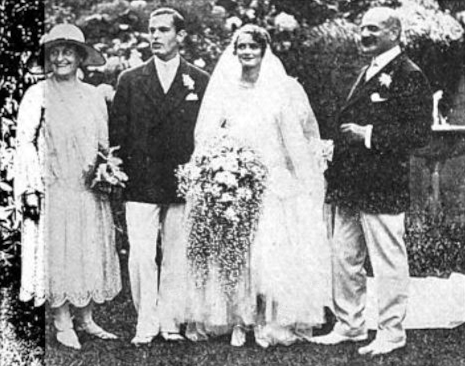
- Warburg (second from left) with his parents and wife Jean in 1926
- Born: Paul Felix Warburg; October 6, 1904; New York, New York, US
- Died: October 8, 1965 (aged 61); New York, New York, US
- Education: Lincoln School of Teachers College; Columbia University; Middlesex School
- Occupation: Banker
- Spouses: Jean Stettheimer (m. 1926; div. 1934) Muriel Constance Woodworth Hart (m. 1939, divorced) Barbara Tapper (m. 1949)
- Parents: Felix M. Warburg (father); Frieda Schiff (mother)

Paul Felix Warburg (October 6, 1904 – October 8, 1965) was an American banker from New York.

== Life ==
Warburg was born on October 6, 1904, in New York City, the son of banker Felix M. Warburg and philanthropist Frieda Schiff. A member of the Warburg family, his grandfather was Jacob Schiff.

Warburg attended the Lincoln School of Teachers College, Columbia University, and the Middlesex School in Concord, Massachusetts. He graduated from the latter school in 1921. He worked for Central Hudson Gas & Electric in Poughkeepsie from 1921 to 1922, Baltimore and Ohio Railroad in Baltimore, Maryland, from 1922 to 1925, and the North American Company from 1925 to 1926. In 1929, he became assistant vice-president of the International Acceptance Trust Company, Inc, which later merged with the Bank of Manhattan Company in New York City. In 1931, he became vice-president of the latter bank. He then spent a few years carrying out his father's philanthropic activities and serving as an officer in various charitable and social work organizations. In 1940, he became a general partner of J. S. Bache & Co.

Warburg was no longer active in Bache in 1942, and in 1944 he left the firm. In 1942, during World War II, he enlisted in the United States Army and was commissioned a captain of the Army Specialist Corps. He was later promoted to lieutenant colonel. He went overseas in 1942 as part of a task force that landed in Casablanca, Morocco under George S. Patton. He then served as administrative officer in the G-2 (intelligence) section until he was ordered to the Allied Force Headquarters in Algiers, Algeria, where he served as liaison officer between Headquarters and the political affairs section. In 1944, he was transferred to Paris, France, with State Department files for the American embassy in that city. He stayed in Paris afterwards as administrative officer in the embassy's military attache office until 1946, when he returned to America and was honorably discharged. The French government decorated him with the Croix de Guerre and the Legion of Honour for his military service. Following his discharge from the army, he began working for the American embassy in London, England, where he served as special assistant to ambassadors W. Averell Harriman and Lewis W. Douglas. He worked as special assistant until 1950. He maintained an office with the investment banking firm Loeb, Rhoades & Co. from 1952 until the end of his life, managing the family philanthropy the Mr. and Mrs. Paul Felix Warburg Fund as well as other philanthropies.

Warburg was a founder, president and director of the Federation Employment Service of New York. He was a director of the County Trust Company at White Plains, the Staten Island Rapid Transit Company, and the Westchester County Conservation Committee. He became secretary of the Jewish Board of Guardians in 1930, chairman of the board of trustees of the New York Association of the Blind in 1932, vice-president and chairman of the New York committee of the National Jewish Hospital at Denver, Colorado, vice-president of the Business Men's Council of the Federation for Support of Jewish Philanthropic Societies in 1934 (and its chairman in 1937), treasurer of the German Jewish Children's Aid and the National Co-ordinating Committee for Aid to Refugees and Immigrants Coming from Germany in 1935, and a member-at-large of the national council of the Boy Scouts of America.

Before World War II, he was active in bringing refugee children to America via the German Jewish Children's Aid and the United States Committee for the Care of European Children. He served as vice-chairman of the national board of directors and secretary of the New York committee of Project HOPE for several years. He was also a founder of the Greater New York Fund and the National Refugee Service, a director and vice-president of the American Council for the International Promotion of Democracy Under God, chairman of the business and industry advisory committee and a member of the national advisory committee of the American Jewish Committee, and a member of the Chamber of Commerce of the City of New York, the Harmonie Club, the Madison Square Garden Club, the Recess Club, the Wall Street Club, the Century Club of White Plains, the Stanwich Club of Greenwich, Connecticut, and the Vineyard Haven Yacht Club in Vineyard Haven, Massachusetts. He belonged to Congregation Emanu-El of New York. A Republican, he was a director of the United Republican Finance Committee for some years, finance chairman for all of John V. Lindsay's congressional campaigns, and head of the New York State Citizens for Eisenhower-Nixon in 1952. He was also an executive committee member of the American Arbitration Association and vice-president of the English-Speaking Union.

In 1926, Warburg married Jean Stettheimer of San Francisco, California, at her family's country home in Atherton, with Rabbi Jonah B. Wise performing the ceremony and Jean's sister Barbara Ochs Adler attending the bride. They divorced in 1934. In 1939, he married Mrs. Muriel Constance Woodworth Hart at his cousin John M. Schiff's home in New York City, with New York Supreme Court Justice Samuel I. Rosenman performing the ceremony. In 1949, he married his third wife, Baroness D'Almeida Santos, formerly Barbara Tapper of Chicago, Illinois, at the Westminster City Registry Office at Caxton Hall in London, England, with first secretary of the American embassy Henry E. Stebbins serving as best man, John J. McCloy giving away the bride. 250 people attended the wedding reception, including the Marquis of Milford Haven, the Marquess of Blandford, the Earl of Carnarvon, Prince Georg of Denmark, members of the diplomatic corps, and other prominent members in London society. He had two daughters from his first marriage, Felicia S. (who married Robert W. Sarnoff) and Jill (who married Herbert W. Maass Jr.).

Warburg died from a heart attack at New York Hospital on October 8, 1965. His funeral was held at Temple Emanu-El.
