= Saint Grottlesex =

Group of American college-prep boarding schools

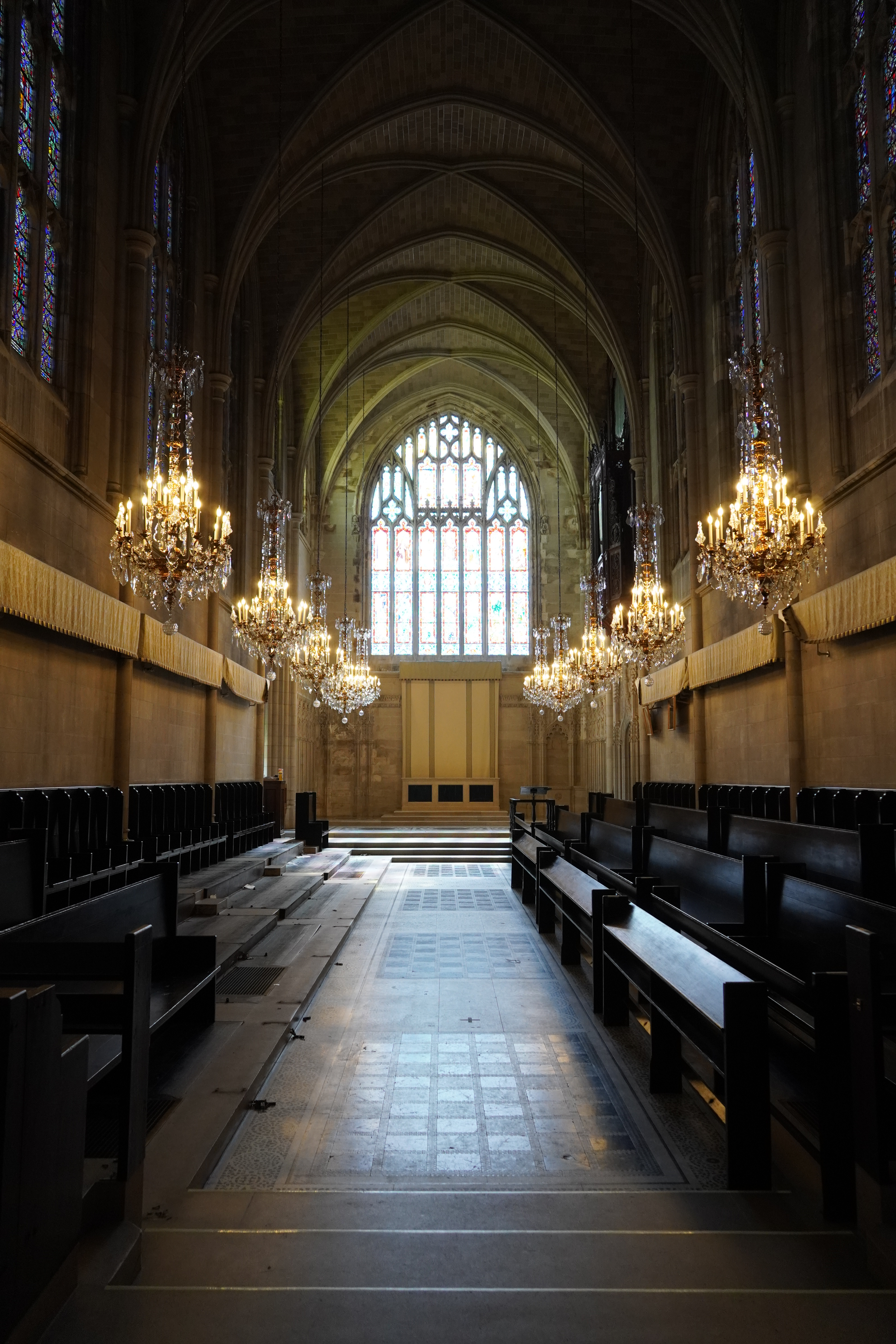
The St. George's chapel (1928) was added to the National Register of Historic Places in 2004.

Saint Grottlesex refers to several American college-preparatory boarding schools in New England that historically educated the social and economic elite of the Northeastern United States. The schools are traditionally given as St. Mark's School, St. Paul's School, St. George's School, Groton School and Middlesex School, although some scholars also include Kent School and some omit St. George's.

== History ==
The St. Grottlesex schools are part of a much larger set of boarding schools, which are primarily concentrated in the Northeastern United States. St. Paul's and St. Mark's were founded in the middle of the nineteenth century, but the other three St. Grottlesex schools were established at the turn of the twentieth century during a large boom in the boarding school industry that also included Lawrenceville (refounded 1883), Milton (refounded 1884), Taft (founded 1890), Hotchkiss (1891), Choate (1896), Kent (1906), and Loomis (1914). St. Paul's and St. Mark's also more than tripled in enrollment during this period.

Although the St. Grottlesex schools were not the only college-preparatory boarding schools founded during the Gilded Age, they stood out for their aristocratic reputation and their college placement record.

=== Historical composition of student bodies ===
The St. Grottlesex schools are broadly associated with upper-class Protestantism in the United States and preppy culture. St. Mark's, St. Paul's, St. George's, and Groton are all affiliated with the Episcopal Church, the wealthiest Protestant denomination. At the oral argument for Pierce v. Society of Sisters (1925), a Supreme Court case about whether a state could require children at Catholic and private schools to attend public school instead, the counsel for the schools argued that if a state could effectively outlaw Catholic schools, it could also outlaw Episcopal schools like the ones in St. Grottlesex. (The schools ultimately won.) In addition, Middlesex, though ostensibly nonsectarian, was established by similarly upper-class Unitarian Boston Brahmins.

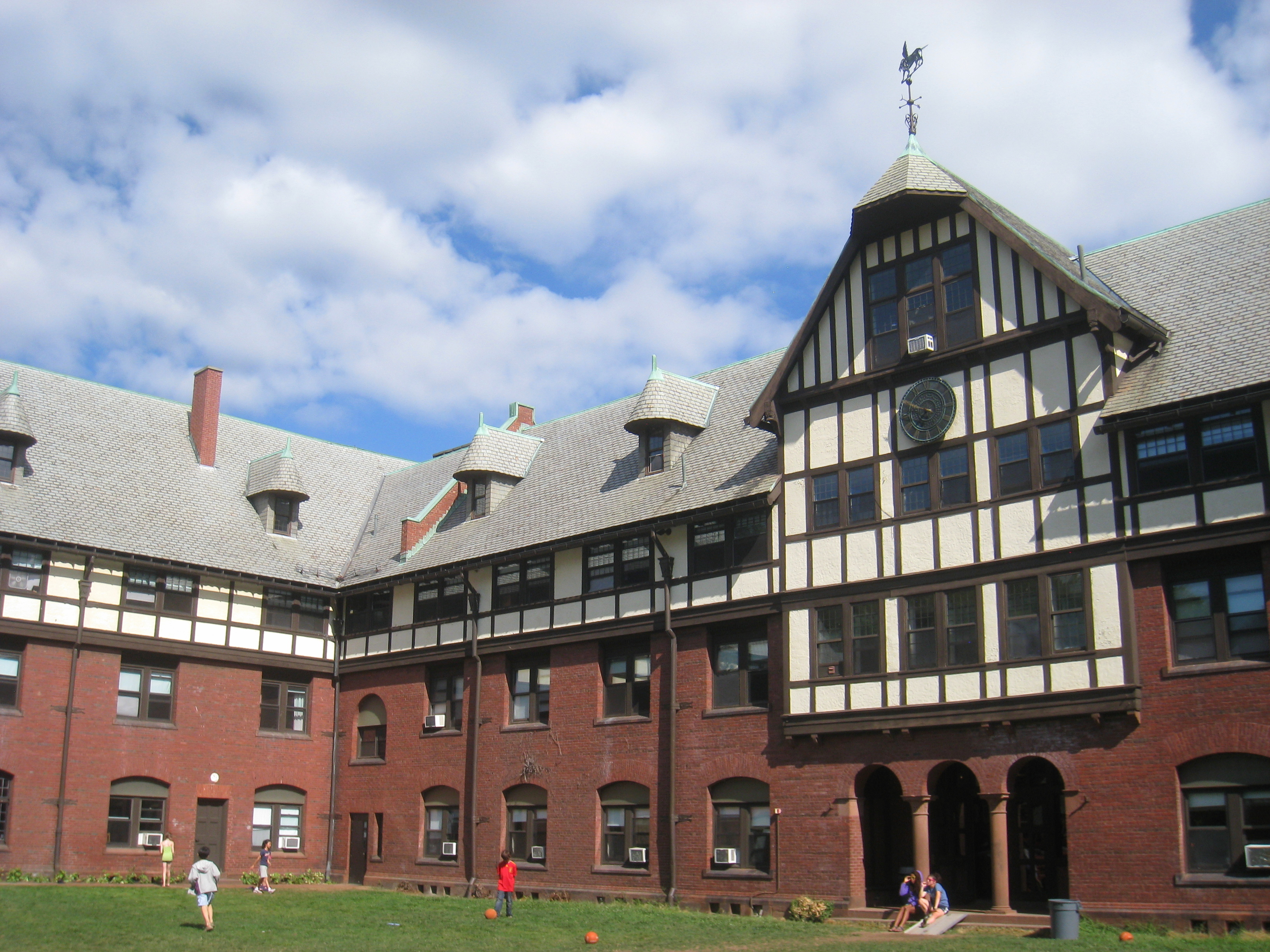
The St. Grottlesex schools often favored anachronistic English architectural styles. At St. Mark's, many of the buildings are mock Tudor.

The St. Grottlesex schools (as well as some other institutions, like Lawrenceville) were consciously styled as the American equivalent of the English public schools, in contrast to the eighteenth-century "academies" like Andover, Exeter, Lawrence, and Deerfield, which were typically set up when a rural town lacked the tax revenue to support a public school, and principally educated students from the surrounding area. They soon attracted an aristocratic clientele. In 1906, four-fifths of Groton and St. Mark's parents were listed in the Social Register.

Moreover, unlike their academy forebears, the Gilded Age schools expected all their students to go on to college. For example, while Exeter (founded 1781) and Middlesex (founded 1901) were both strongholds of Unitarianism and prepared students for Unitarian Harvard, as late as the 1880s only 18% of Exeter graduates went to college. Although the oldest schools (St. Paul's and St. Mark's) were not founded as fully college-preparatory institutions, both adopted the full prep-school model and became Ivy League feeder schools.

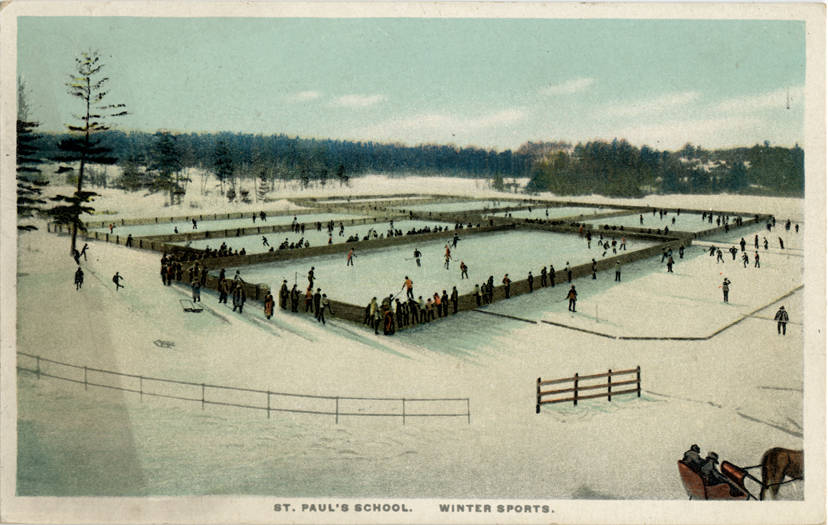
Wealthy boarding schools could afford to sponsor a variety of extracurricular activities. In 1883, St. Paul's hosted the first organized ice hockey game in the United States.

The St. Grottlesex schools entrenched their social distinctiveness by charging much higher tuition than the academies. When Groton was founded in 1884, it charged $500 a year for tuition, room, and board. By contrast, Lawrence charged $200 a year; Andover charged $69 a year for tuition and room (board not included); and Exeter charged $45 a year (room and board not included). As late as 1940, tuition at Groton, St. Paul's, and St. Mark's was still nearly 30% higher than at Andover and Exeter (albeit less expensive than Deerfield); at Middlesex and St. George's it was closer to 50% higher.

=== Trends in college placement ===
The St. Grottlesex schools' aristocratic culture strengthened their reputations with leading universities. The schools found a helpful ally in Harvard president Charles Eliot, who distrusted public high schools. Although he complimented Exeter for its "national" reach and "democratic" character, he encouraged boarding schools to temper America's "habitual regard for masses and majorities" with "aristocratic institutions" and "noble family stock[]." In fact, Eliot personally sponsored the establishment of Groton and Middlesex.

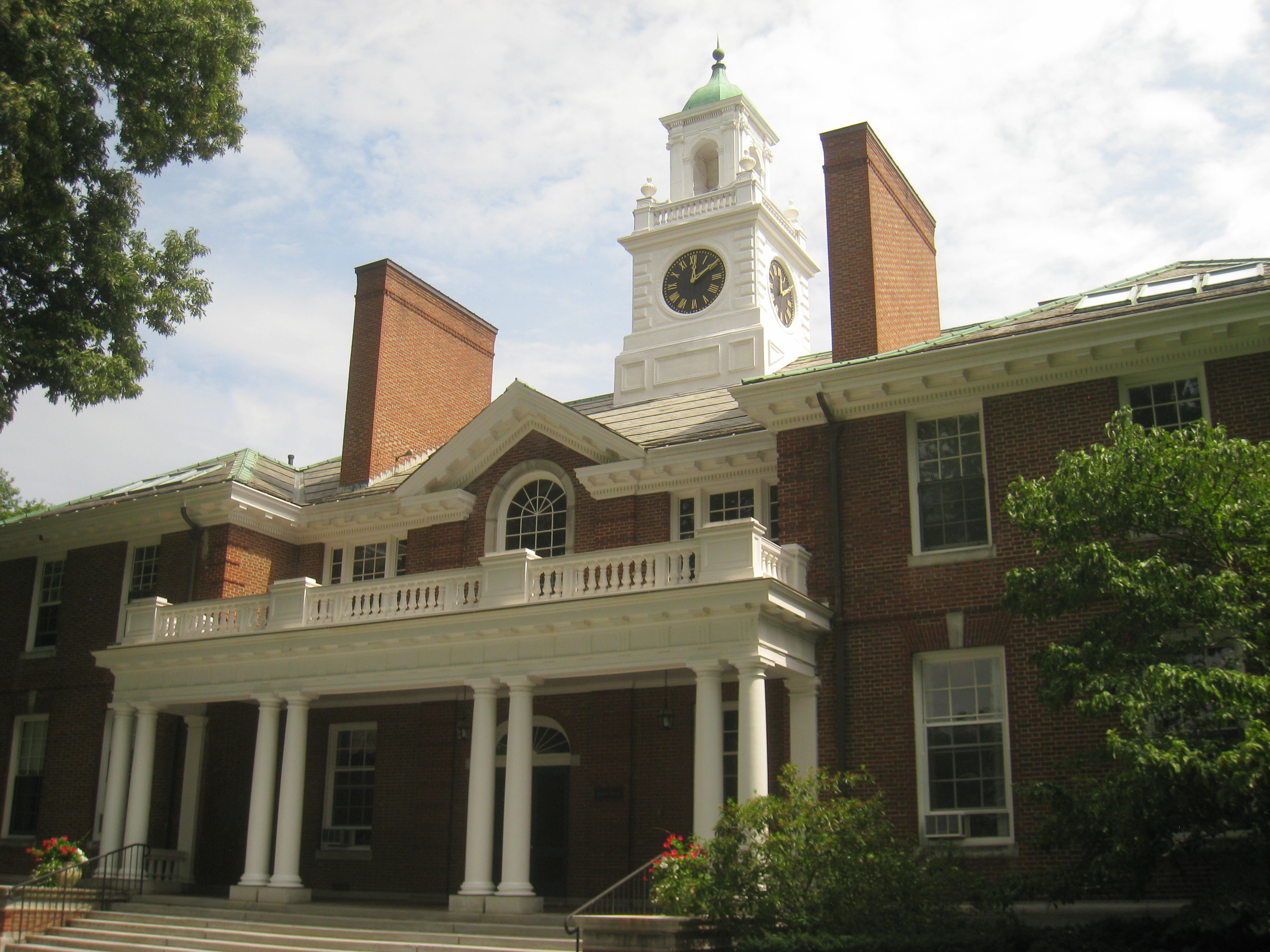
Middlesex named its main administrative building after Harvard president Charles William Eliot, an early supporter of the school.

Harvard's admissions office continued favoring St. Grottlesex alumni after Eliot's retirement. Even at mid-century, St. Mark's, St. Paul's, Groton, and Middlesex were still sending a larger percentage of their graduates to Harvard, Yale, and Princeton than their peer boarding schools. (Two notable exceptions were Andover and Exeter, which successfully reinvented themselves as college-preparatory schools.) In 1959, the university conducted an internal study to see which of its top 79 feeder schools produced the most honors graduates per capita. It found that "not one of the 30 top institutions was an eastern boarding school" and that "[s]ome of the St. Grottlesex schools, in particular, had especially poor records."

Once Ivy League schools raised academic standards for undergraduate admissions in the 1950s and 1960s, St. Grottlesex's advantage partially dissipated, as nearly all the traditional feeder schools lost significant market share during this period. Even Boston Latin School, one of Harvard's few public school feeders, saw its yearly Harvard contingent shrink from nearly 100 students a year in the 1950s to 15-25 in the 1980s.

The private schools tried to keep up academically, but they continued to lose ground. Sociologist Digby Baltzell (a St. Paul's graduate) noted that although the SPS class of 1965 was better educated and "far brighter" than the class of 1935, that was not reflected in their college records. In 1935, nearly the entire graduating class went to Harvard, Yale, or Princeton. In 1965, that figure shrank to 42 out of 102, roughly the same percentage of SPS students that attained National Merit Scholarship recognition. Reinforcing this trend, the middle schools that traditionally fed students to St. Grottlesex began sending most of their students to private day schools instead, leading Groton's admissions director to comment that "the competition [for spots] isn't as stiff as it used to be, and the classics scholars are getting worried about a decline in intellectual quality." That said, efforts to improve academics paid off to some extent. The schools that "fail[ed] to bend to [university] leverage" fared worst of all, as Harvard simply stopped admitting their students.

This process continued beyond the 1960s and eventually forced reforms. The schools broadened their applicant pools by belatedly admitting girls and ethnic minorities. Groton's first black student graduated in 1956, followed by St. Paul's (1964), St. George's (1968), St. Mark's (1969), and Middlesex (1970). Gender integration took longer. St. Paul's welcomed its first female students in 1971, followed by St. George's (1972), Middlesex (1974), Groton (1975), and St. Mark's (1977). Even so, this expansion of the applicant pool was not enough to fully arrest the decline in college outcomes. In 1992, St. Paul's appointed a new rector with a "mandate ... to improve the quality of the school academically," as "[n]obody had gone to Harvard in five years, except for legacies."

== Member schools ==
The St. Grottlesex schools are traditionally given as:

School	Location	Year Founded	Religious Affiliation
St. Mark's School	Southborough, MA	1865	Episcopal Church (United States)
St. Paul's School	Concord, NH	1856	Episcopal
St. George's School	Middletown, RI	1896	Episcopal
Groton School	Groton, MA	1884	Episcopal
Middlesex School	Concord, MA	1901	Nonsectarian (unofficially Unitarian)

In addition, Kent School, another Episcopal boarding school, is occasionally categorized within St. Grottlesex.

== Origin and usage of the term ==
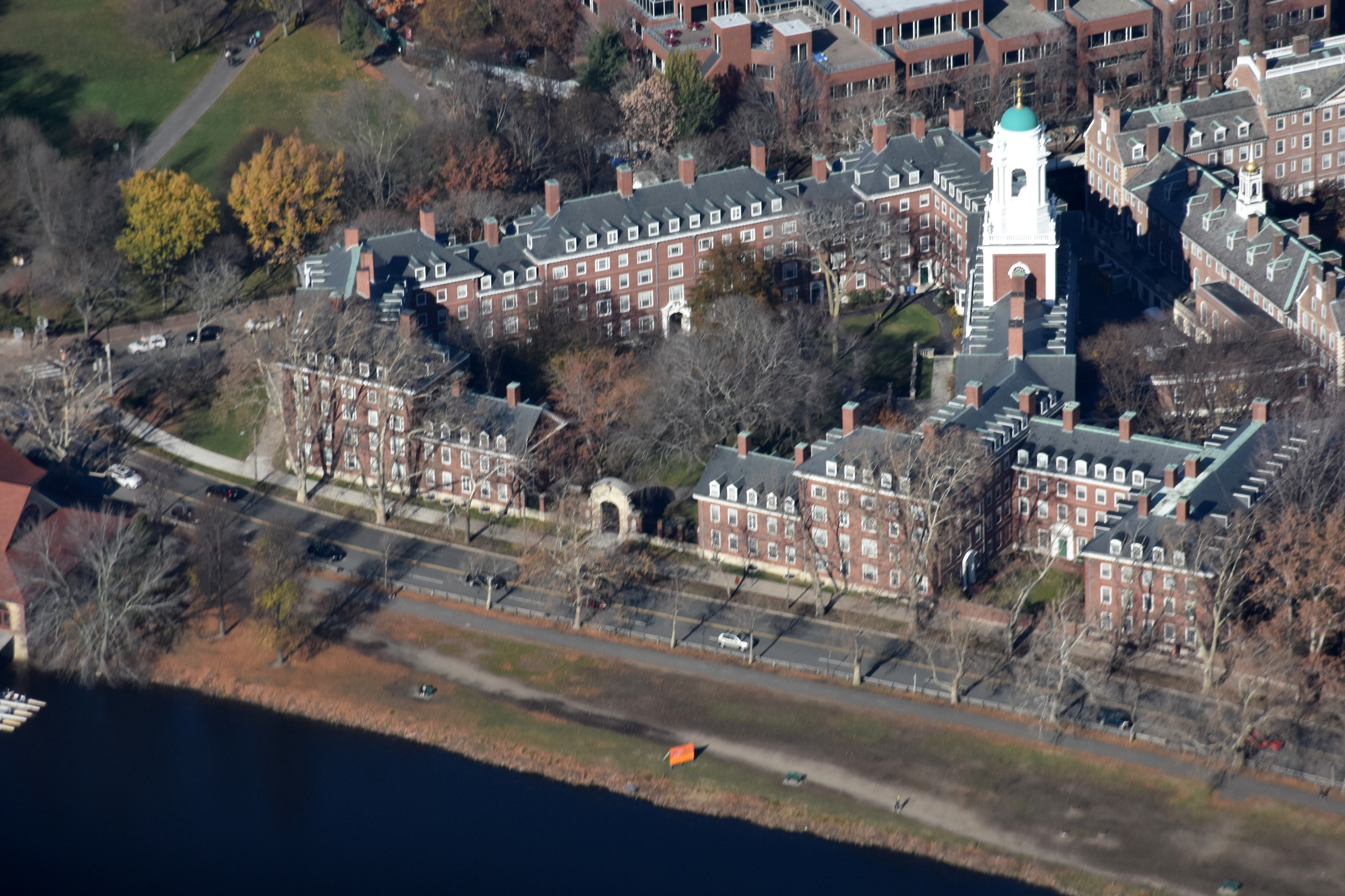
Eliot House was once considered a "bastion of ... champion rowers[] and Yankee aristocrats." The school paper dryly remarked that to live in Eliot, recommendation letters were helpful but "it is not by any means necessary to ... be a Groton graduate."

The term is a portmanteau of the St. part of St. Mark's, St. Paul's, and St. George's, then part of Groton, an extra t, and then ending with Middlesex.

There is no clear consensus on the source of the term; however, most sources link it to admissions practices and undergraduate student life at Harvard College, where St. Grottlesex alumni traditionally sat "[a]t the top of the social hierarchy." The Harvard sociologist George C. Homans claimed that Harvard's admissions office coined the term to help categorize and sort through Harvard applicants, although Harvard graduate student Richard W. Leopold said that the university preferred the term "Select Private Schools." There were also categories for Andover/Exeter, other private schools, and public schools.

For students, the practical impact was primarily that boarding school alumni clustered within certain dormitories. Until the 1970s, the deans of Harvard's undergraduate dormitories were allowed to pick and choose their own students. The first deans of Eliot House and Lowell House were both Groton affiliates, and over time, these houses developed a reputation for being "exclusively St. Grottlesex." Similarly, John Kenneth Galbraith wrote that when he was a tutor at Winthrop House, his dean's policy was to "automatically" accept alumni of St. Grottlesex and to "generally" accept alumni of Andover and Exeter. St. Grottlesex alumni also historically dominated admission to Harvard's exclusive undergraduate final clubs.
