= Frederick M. Warburg =

American banker (1897–1973)

- Born: October 14, 1897; New York City
- Died: July 10, 1973 (aged 75); Winchester, Virginia
- Education: Bovee School, Middlesex School
- Occupation: Banker
- Spouse: Wilma M. Shannon

Frederick Marcus Warburg (October 14, 1897 – July 10, 1973) was a Jewish-American banker from New York.

== Life ==
Warburg was born on October 14, 1897, in New York City, the son of banker Felix M. Warburg and Frieda Schiff. A member of the Jewish German-American Warburg family, his maternal grandfather was Jacob Schiff.

Warburg attended the Bovee School in New York City and the Middlesex School in Concord, Massachusetts. He went to Harvard College in 1915, where he was editorial chairman of The Harvard Crimson and captain of the Reserve Officers' Training Corps. He delivered the Ivy Oration when he graduated from Harvard with an A.B in 1919. In November 1918, during World War I, he graduated from the Infantry Officers' Candidate School in Camp Lee, Virginia. He then spent nineteen years in the Officers' Reserve Corps. After finishing college, he went to Poland on an inspection trip for the Joint Distribution Committee to study relief and rehabilitation in Eastern Europe.

Warburg began working as an investment banker after graduating from Harvard and was associated with the American International Corporation from 1919 to 1921, the M. M. Warburg & Co. from 1921 to 1922, Kuhn, Loeb & Co. from 1922 to 1927, and the Lehman Brothers from 1927 to 1930. In 1931, he became a partner of Kuhn, Loeb & Co. In February 1942, during World War II, he was recommissioned to the United States Army as a major. In August 1942, he was promoted to lieutenant colonel in the Adjutant General's Department. He was then assigned to the Special Service Division, Army Service Forces. He became chief of athletics and recreation in the Army Special Services, and he left military service in 1946 with the rank of colonel.

Warburg served as director of the Harvard Alumni Association from 1939 to 1941. He became a trustee of the American Museum of Natural History in 1937, vice-chairman of the Greater New York Councils of the Boy Scouts of America in 1934, president of the 92nd Street Y in 1940, director of the National Recreation Association in 1938, director of the Beekman Street Hospital in 1936, and president of overseers of the Middlesex School in Concord, Massachusetts. A self-declared left-wing Republican, he became a member of the New York Republican County Committee in 1932. He was a member of the Harvard Clubs of New York and Boston, the Bond Club of New York City, the City Midday Club, the Century Country Club, the Harmonie Club, and the River Club.

Warburg was also a director of the Association of YM-YMHAs of Greater New York, a chairman of the JDC, vice-president of the Federation of Jewish Philanthropies, a director and administration committee member of the American Jewish Committee, board chairman and director of the Fresh Air Fund, a board member of the New York Federation for 36 years and its vice-president for 17 years, a trustee of Smith College, a member of the Business Men's Council of the Federation for the Support of Jewish Philanthropic Societies of New York City, and a director of the Museum of Science and Industry, the Los Angeles and Salt Lake Railroad, Surprise Lake Camp, and the International Migration Service. He had an apartment in New York City, a house in Cos Cob, Connecticut, and a horse and cattle farm called Snake Hill in Middleburg, Virginia. He raised and rode hunters and jumpers in the latter. One of his horses, Battle Day, won the 1941 President's Cup at the Rhinebeck‐Dutchess County Fair.

In 1946, Warburg married Wilma M. Shannon, with New York Supreme Court Justice Charles W. Froessel performing the ceremony. Wilma was a personnel executive at R. H. Macy & Co., worked with the Selfridge Provincial Stores, Ltd. in England, aided in selecting women executives for USO service centers during World War II, was with the Office of War Information, and was appointed an assistant personnel director of the UNRRA. They had no children. He was also a recipient of the Silver Buffalo Award from the Boy Scouts of America.

Warburg died from heart disease at Memorial Hospital in Winchester, Virginia, near his farm Snake Hill, on July 10, 1973.
