= American Friends of the Hebrew University =

American nonprofit organization

- Formation: 1925
- Founder: Felix M. Warburg
- President: Pamela Nadler Emmerich
- Website: afhu.org
- Formerly called: American Advisory Committee (1925–1931)

American Friends of the Hebrew University (AFHU) is a non-profit organization headquartered in New York City which promotes and supports the Hebrew University of Jerusalem. American businessman and philanthropist Felix M. Warburg founded AFHU in June 1925 and served as its first chairman. The organization was originally named the "American Advisory Committee" but changed its name to what it is currently known as in 1931.

== Mission and operations ==
The primary mission of AFHU is to provide fundraising, leadership, and stateside presence for the Hebrew University of Jerusalem.

AFHU operates with a board of directors, regional offices throughout the U.S., and a national office overseeing its operations.

== Activities and initiatives ==
AFHU features notable personalities from various fields at events such as gala dinners, lectures, and seminars. These events serve as platforms for fundraising, networking, and driving awareness for Hebrew University among American audiences. In addition, AFHU organizes missions to Israel and visits to the campuses of Hebrew University.

AFHU's highest honor is its Scopus Award, bestowed upon individuals for their humanitarianism and commitment to Israel and the Jewish people. Recipients have included Frank Sinatra (1976), Barbra Streisand (1984), Steven Spielberg (1986), and Larry King (1994).

In December 2008, AFHU launched its inaugural Einstein Award. Microsoft founder and chairman Bill Gates was the first recipient. In 2018, author and professor Walter Isaacson won the award. For over 50 years, AFHU has presented the annual George A. Katz Torch of Learning Award to members of the legal community in recognition of outstanding leadership, professional achievement and commitment to civic and social causes.

Since 2017, AFHU has organized its annual NEXUS: Israel conference to highlight the country's high-tech advances and culture of innovation. Presenters have included academics Daniel Kahneman and Roger D. Kornberg, Canadian author Malcolm Gladwell, and English ethologist and conservationist Jane Goodall.
