= Charles Simonton Moffett =

American art curator (1945–2015)

Charles Simonton Moffett Jr. (1945–2015) was an American art curator.

== Early life and education ==
Born in Washington, D.C., Moffett was raised in a Navy family; his grandfather, Rear Adm. William A. Moffett, was important in the development of naval aviation.

Moffett attended St. George's School in Rhode Island and earned a bachelor's degree in English from Middlebury College in 1967. His early exposure to art included visits to museums such as the Louvre during his father's official trips abroad. He later enrolled in the master's program at New York University Institute of Fine Arts, although he did not complete his doctoral dissertation.

== Career ==
During his career, Moffett held positions at the Nelson-Atkins Museum of Art, Sotheby-Parke Bernet Galleries, and the H. Shickman Gallery. At the Metropolitan Museum of Art, he worked on projects involving Dutch and Flemish paintings and curated exhibitions featuring artists such as Degas and Van Gogh. At the Fine Arts Museums of San Francisco, he organized an exhibition titled "The New Painting: Impressionism 1874–1886," which examined aspects of the Impressionist movement. He authored a book of the same name. He also contributed essays to exhibition "catalogs that remain standard texts for art historians".

After leaving Sotheby's, Moffett worked as a private art adviser. Upon his death, he bequeathed 75 works of art to his alma mater Middlebury College. In 2017, the college organized a posthumous exhibit entitled "A Story of Art: Gifts from the Collection of Charles S. Moffett '67 and Lucinda Herrick".

== Personal life ==
Moffett was married twice and had two children from his second marriage. His son Charles is also a curator.
