= Warburg (surname) =

Warburg is a surname. Notable people with the surname include:

== Warburg family ==
- Aby Warburg (1866–1929), German art historian, founder of the Warburg Institute, husband of Mary Warburg
- Bettina Warburg (1900–1990), psychiatrist, daughter of Paul Warburg
- Edward Warburg (1908–1992), American philanthropist
- Eric M. Warburg (1900–1990), banker and goodwill ambassador
- Felix M. Warburg (1871–1937), New York banker
- James Warburg (1896–1969), American banker, financial adviser to Franklin D. Roosevelt
- Mary Warburg (artist) (1866–1934), German artist, wife of Aby Warburg
- Max Warburg (1867–1946), Hamburg banker
- Paul Warburg (1868–1932), German-born American investment banker
- Siegmund George Warburg (1902–1982), founder of S. G. Warburg & Co., London

== German Warburg family ==
- Emil Warburg (1846–1931), physicist
- Otto Warburg (botanist) (1859–1938), German-Jewish botanist
- Otto Heinrich Warburg (1883–1970), physiologist, winner of the 1931 Nobel Prize in Physiology or Medicine

== Other people ==
- Agnes Warburg (1872–1953), British photographer
- Carl Warburg (c. 1805–1892), German physician and scientist
- E. F. Warburg (1908–1966), English botanist
- Eugene Warburg (1825—1859), African-American sculptor
- Fredric Warburg (1898–1981), publisher, founder of Secker and Warburg
- Kai von Warburg (born 1968), German lightweight rower
- Mary Warburg (1908–2009), American philanthropist
- Margit Warburg (born 1952), Danish sociologist of religion
- Mette Warburg (1926 - 2015), Danish eye specialist
- Sam Warburg (born 1983), American tennis player
- Sydney Warburg (1880–1947), the pen name of an anonymous author who published a book about funding of the Nazi Party by American bankers
- Otto Warburg (disambiguation)
