= Richard Marriott (Lord Lieutenant) =

English banker (1930–2021)

Richard Marriott, CVO, TD, FSA (17 December 1930 – 22 February 2021) was a banker, stockbroker, company director, and public administrator who served as Lord Lieutenant of the East Riding of Yorkshire from 1996 to 2005.

After attending Eton College and Brasenose College, Oxford, Marriott was commissioned into the Rifle Brigade, serving for a year (although he subsequently commanded a regiment in the Territorial Army). He joined the private bank Brown, Shipley & Co. in 1954 and worked for them for ten years, moving to Mullens & Co., the government brokers, as a partner in 1964; he was one of two people who coordinated the British government's sale of its shares in BP in 1977, at the time the world's largest share offering. He left Mullens in 1986 and became director of Mercury Asset Management, a position he gave up on becoming Lord Lieutenant.

In the public sphere, he sat on Humberside's Rural Development Commission from 1986 until 1995 and was its High Sheriff in the 1991–92 year. In the 1990s and early 2000s, he sat on the councils of the National Army Museum and the University of Hull. He was also Chairman of the Officers' Association from 1977 to 1986 and spent 28 years as financial adviser to the Army Benevolent Fund before he served as its treasurer from 1997 to 2000.

Marriott was appointed a Commander of the Royal Victorian Order in the 2006 New Year Honours.

He died on 22 February 2021.
