= Stephen Zimmerman (investor) =

British investment manager

- Born: April 1949 (age 77)
- Occupation: Businessman
- Known for: deputy chairman and co-head of Mercury Asset Management (1990 to 2001)

Stephen Anthony Zimmerman (born April 1949) is a British investment manager best known for his tenure as deputy chairman and co-head of Mercury Asset Management (MAM) during the 1990s, a period in which he worked in close partnership with Carol Galley.

== Career ==
Zimmerman joined City of London investment bank S.G. Warburg & Co. in 1971, becoming a director of investment subsidiary, Mercury Asset Management in 1979 and deputy chairman from 1990. Along with Galley, who joined the company at the same time, Zimmerman has been credited with driving the growth of Mercury Asset Management during the 1980s and 1990s.

The author Philip Augar wrote of Mercury in the 1980s and 1990s: “Under the leadership of [Peter] Stormonth Darling and then the triumvirate of Hugh Stevenson, Carol Galley and Stephen Zimmerman, Mercury caught the rising tide of instructional investment in the UK quite brilliantly.”

Following the sale of Mercury to Merrill Lynch in 1997, Zimmerman stayed on with Galley to lead the integration process as co-heads. They announced their departure simultaneously in March 2001, maintaining the parallel career paths they had followed for three decades. Commenting on his exit, Zimmerman told The Wall Street Journal that he ‘wouldn’t be surprised to end up sharing an office with [Galley] again’. Writing at the same time, The Daily Telegraph columnist, Neil Collins, predicted they’d set up a boutique investment firm together.

In the 2003, Zimmerman did set up a boutique, but with other ex-Merrill colleagues, Michael Marks and Paul Roy (as opposed to Galley, who remained in retirement). The new Venture was called NewSmith in a nod, Smith New Court, another City institution bought by Merrill Lynch in the 1990s and previously run by Marks and Roy. NewSmith did well during the financial crisis, though asset under management declined during the following decade. In an echo of his departure from Merrill Lynch, Zimmerman retired at the same time as co-founder, Marks (NewSmith was acquired by Man Group less than a year later).

== Other activities ==
Zimmerman has been active in supporting London-based Jewish charities. Of particular note, he was chairman of Jewish Care from 2006 to 2011, and remains an honorary president.
