= Warburg Pincus =

American multinational private equity firm

Warburg Pincus LLC

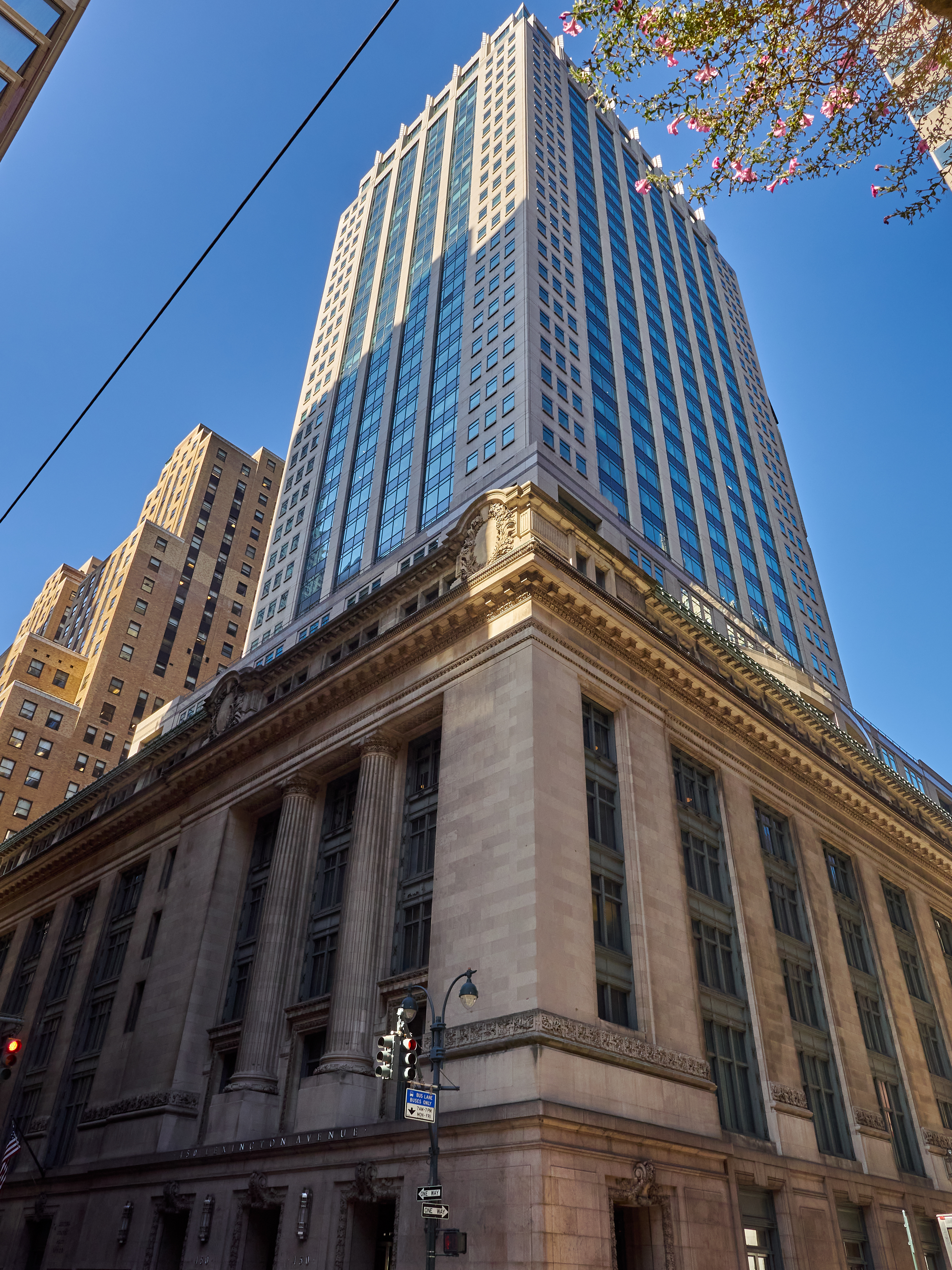
- Headquarters at 450 Lexington Avenue
- Type: Private
- Industry: Private equity
- Founded: 1966; 60 years ago
- Founders: Eric Warburg; Lionel Pincus
- Headquarters: 450 Lexington Avenue; New York City, New York, U.S.
- Key people: Timothy Geithner (chairman); Charles R. "Chip" Kaye (chairman); Jeffrey Perlman (CEO)
- Products: Investments; Private equity funds
- AUM: US$100 billion (2026)
- Number of employees: 775 (2024)
- Website: warburgpincus.com

Warburg Pincus LLC is an American multinational private equity firm based in New York City, with offices in the United States, Europe, Brazil, China, Japan, the Middle East, Southeast Asia and India. One of the oldest in the world, it has been a private equity investor since 1966.

As of March 2026, the company had over $100 billion in assets under management and invests in a range of sectors including retail, industrial manufacturing, energy, financial services, health care, technology, media, and real estate. A growth investor, Warburg Pincus has raised 22 private equity funds, two real estate funds and one capital solutions fund, which have invested over $130 billion in more than 1,100 companies across 45 countries.

In June 2024, Warburg Pincus was ranked ninth in Private Equity International's PEI 300 ranking of the largest private equity firms in the world.

== History ==
=== Founding and early history ===
In 1939, Eric Warburg of the Warburg banking family founded a company under the name E.M. Warburg & Co. Its first address was 52 William Street, New York, the Kuhn Loeb building. Throughout the early post-war period, the firm was a small office of 20 employees. In 1966, E.M. Warburg merged with Lionel I. Pincus & Co, forming a new company that eventually became known as E.M. Warburg, Pincus & Co. In 1965, when Eric Warburg retired to Germany, control was handed to Lionel Pincus, a partner in the Ladenburg Thalmann investment bank, and the working language of the office switched from German to English.

In 1967, John Vogelstein, a former partner at Lazard Freres, joined Pincus to build the firm. Together they developed a strategy of investing in diversified companies of various sizes rather than focusing on start-ups. Pincus was the founder and chairman while Vogelstein was vice chairman and then president. Pincus and Vogelstein ran the company until 2002, when they stepped down and appointed Charles Kaye and Joseph P. Landy as co-presidents. Pincus died in 2009.

Warburg Pincus began investing in Europe in 1983 and opened its first office in Asia in 1994. It has invested more than $5 billion in Europe; more than $3 billion in India and more than $3.3 billion in China. The firm is headquartered in New York and has offices in Beijing, Berlin, Hong Kong, Houston, London, the Middle East, Mumbai, San Francisco, São Paulo, Shanghai, Singapore and Tokyo, with administrative offices in Amsterdam, Luxembourg and Mauritius.

The firm is structured as a global partnership led by chief executive officer Jeffrey Perlman, who was promoted from president to CEO in 2024. Charles R. "Chip" Kaye, who was CEO for 22 years, transitioned to co-chairman alongside Timothy Geithner.

=== Initial public offerings ===
As of July 2025, its portfolio companies had completed more than 190 initial public offerings on more than 24 exchanges. In August 2010, a six-year partnership between management and Warburg Pincus led to MEG Energy's successful IPO.

=== Funds ===
Warburg Pincus has a history of venture capital investing. The firm is a founding member of the venture capital associations in the U.S. and China, and offers a global entrepreneur in residence program to help start up new businesses.

In October 2014, Reuters reported that Warburg Pincus had raised $4 billion for its first energy-focused private equity fund. In late 2018, Warburg Pincus closed its Warburg Pincus Global Growth, L.P. fund at $14.8 billion, and in June 2019, closed its Warburg Pincus China-Southeast Asia II, L.P. fund at $4.25 billion.

In April 2023, Warburg Pincus and ArchiMed agreed to sell the France-headquartered business Polyplus to life science group Sartorius for approximately €2.4 billion.

=== Fight over the Warburg name ===
During the post-war period, Eric Warburg vied with his cousin Siegmund Warburg, founder of S.G. Warburg, over the use of the Warburg name in New York. Siegmund wished to expand the S.G. Warburg franchise into New York but was blocked by the existence of E.M. Warburg & Co. Following the effective sale of the business to Pincus, Siegmund Warburg accused Eric of prostituting the Warburg name. "Complicating matters was that Siegmund thought Pincus the wrong kind of Jew—of Eastern European ancestry, with a garment-district background. Professionally, he thought Pincus well below haute banque stature in the venture capital world."

In January 1970, Siegmund finally got the name changed to E.M. Warburg, Pincus & Company to differentiate it from S.G. Warburg & Company. "In the end, however, Lionel Pincus had the last laugh on Siegmund. He expanded Eric's tiny firm into a giant, thriving business, with three and a half billion dollars of venture capital partnerships."

In 1999, they attempted to purchase English Premier League association football club Everton.

== Investment funds ==
| Fund | Vintage Year | Capital ($m) |
|---|---|---|
| Warburg Pincus Ventures International, L.P. | 1997 | $800 |
| Warburg Pincus International Partners, L.P. | 2000 | $2,500 |
| EMW Ventures Inc. | 1971 | $41 |
| Warburg Pincus Private Equity VIII, L.P. | 2001 | $5,300 |
| Warburg Pincus Private Equity IX, L.P. | 2005 | $8,000 |
| Warburg Pincus Real Estate I, L.P. | 2006 | $1,200 |
| Warburg Pincus Private Equity X, L. P. | 2007 | $15,100 |
| Warburg Pincus Private Equity XI, L.P. | 2012 | $11,200 |
| Warburg Pincus Energy, L.P. | 2014 | $4,000 |
| Warburg Pincus Private Equity XII, L.P. | 2015 | $13,400 |
| Warburg Pincus China, L.P. | 2016 | $2,000 |
| Warburg Pincus Financial Sector, L.P. | 2017 | $2,300 |
| Warburg Pincus Global Growth, L.P. | 2018 | $14,800 |
| Warburg Pincus China-Southeast Asia II L.P. | 2019 | $4,250 |
| Warburg Pincus Asia Real Estate Fund, L.P. | 2021 | $2,800 |
| Warburg Pincus Financial Sector II, L.P. | 2021 | $2,600 |
| Warburg Pincus Global Growth 14, L.P. | 2023 | $17,300 |
| Warburg Pincus Capital Solutions Founders Fund, L.P. | 2024 | $4,000 |
| Warburg Pincus Financial Sector III, L.P. | 2026 | $3,000 |

== Acquisition, partnership and merger ==
Warburg Pincus invested in the information and communication technology sectors, including investments in Avaya, Bharti Tele-Ventures, Harbour Networks, NeuStar, PayScale, and Telcordia.

Warburg Pincus has invested in companies such as CityMD, The Summit Medical Group, Harbin Pharmaceutical, Venari Resources, NIO, ZTO Express in China and South East Asia, Bharti Telecommunications, Apollo Tyres Ltd, Ecom Express, SBI General Insurance in India, AmRest in Poland and Nuance Communications in the U.S. In 2019, the firm acquired a majority stake in healthcare tech company WebPT from Battery Ventures.

In May 2024, Warburg Pincus acquired Shriram Housing Finance at Rs 4,630 crore.

In August 2024, Warburg Pincus and Australian real estate group Lendlease reached the final close of a joint venture platform, each committing 50% of the co-investment capital, focused on life sciences and research-and-development real estate in the Asia-Pacific region; the platform was later named Vita Partners. In the same month, Warburg Pincus made a $100 million investment into Miami International Holdings, a major exchange operator in the U.S.

In October 2024, Warburg Pincus invested $125 million in Contabilizei, Brazil's leading accounting firm. The deal made Warburg Pincus Contabilizei's largest shareholder, acquiring stakes from venture capital funds including Kaszek, which had invested in Contabilizei since 2014.

In January 2025, Warburg Pincus entered into a $300 million strategic partnership with Mashura, a leading inventory intelligence platform in healthcare.

On 10 March 2025, Warburg Pincus announced that D&D Investment, a subsidiary asset manager of SK D&D, one of Korea's largest multi-family businesses and developers, has signed a joint agreement to invest in the Korean senior housing market. Through this partnership, the company will focus on securing and developing housing for the elderly in the Seoul metropolitan area.

In October 2025, Warburg Pincus agreed to acquire German infrastructure software company PSI AG for more than €700 million ($813.26 million). The deal values PSI at €45 per share, which was a 50% premium on the stock price at the time. PSI will remain headquartered in Berlin.

In December 2025, Warburg Pincus and Permira agreed to acquire software-as-a-service (SaaS) fintech company Clearwater Analytics in an $8.4 billion deal.

== See also ==
- M. M. Warburg & Co.
- S. G. Warburg & Co.
