= Michael Naumann =

German journalist and politician

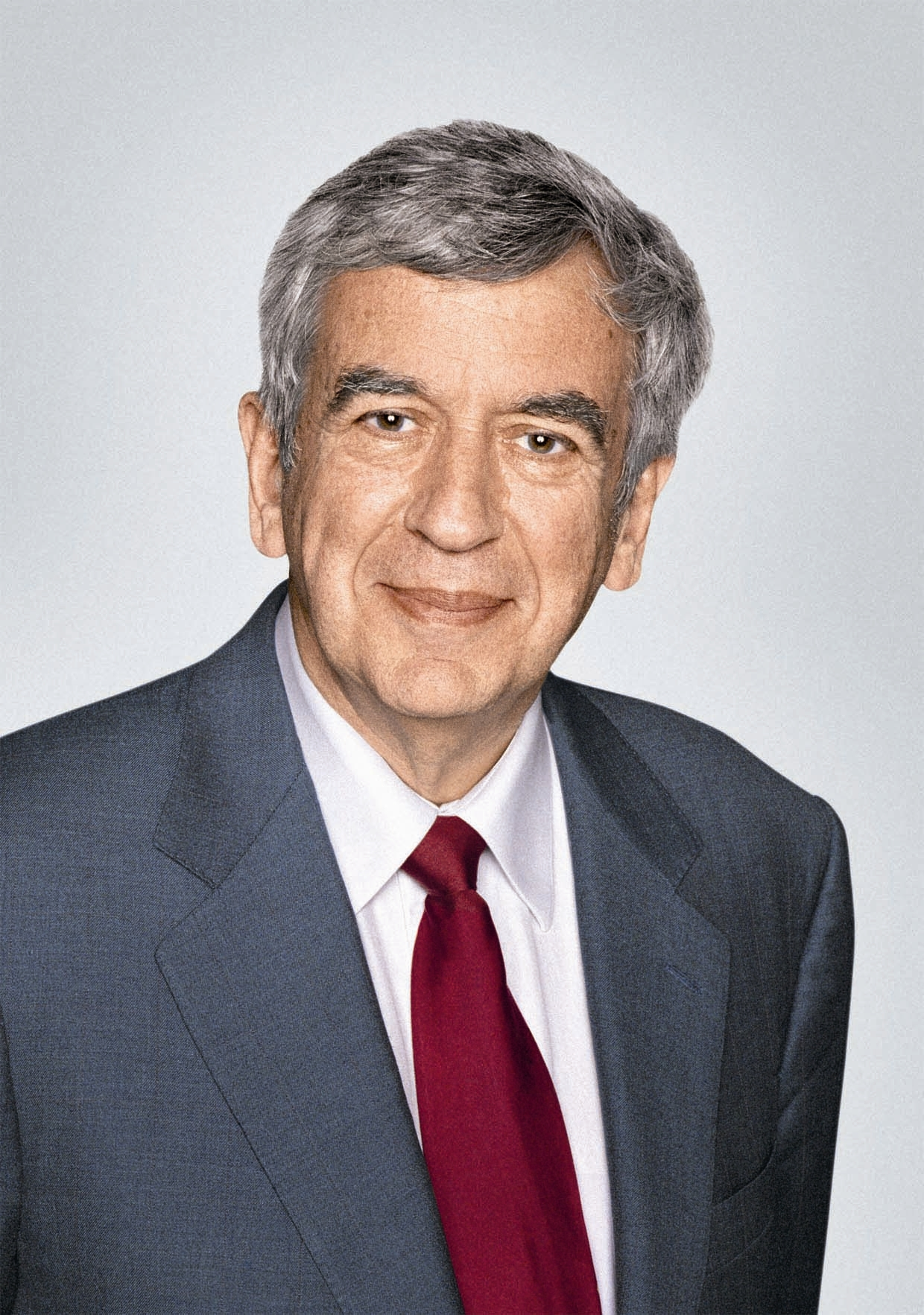
Naumann in 2007

Michael Naumann (born 8 December 1941) is a German politician, publisher and journalist. He was the German secretary of culture from 1998 until 2001. He is married to Marie Warburg, daughter of Eric Warburg and granddaughter of Max Warburg.

From 2012 to 2021, Naumann was director of the Barenboim–Said Academy in Berlin.

== Early life and education ==
Naumann was born as the son of a lawyer in Köthen, Saxony-Anhalt. His father was killed in 1942 in the Battle of Stalingrad. At the age of eleven, Naumann had to flee to Hamburg with his mother in 1953. Because of contacts with her Jewish relatives who had emigrated to the USA, she had been targeted by the Ministry of State Security of the GDR.

Naumann graduated with a PhD in political science from LMU Munich in 1969 and continued his studies as a Florey scholar at Queen's College, Oxford. Naumann wrote his dissertation on Karl Kraus's Der Abbau der verkehrten Welt ("On overcoming a wrong world"), his habilitation on Structural Change of Heroism, from Sacred to Profane in 1978; he has also written a number of academic essays on theories of revolution.

== Career ==
=== In publishing and the media ===
Naumann worked for Der Spiegel and for Die Zeit, for the latter as a chief-editor and later as a publisher. In 1985, Naumann became publisher of the publishing house Rowohlt Verlag. In 1995, he went to New York, first leading Metropolitan Books, then Henry Holt. He hosted a highbrow political talk show in German television, Talk im Palais from 2004 until becoming SPD candidate for mayor of Hamburg in 2007. From 2010 to 2012, he was chief-editor and publisher of Cicero.

== Political career ==
=== Secretary of Culture ===
Between 1998 and 2001, Naumann served as the first Secretary of Culture (German title: Beauftragter der Bundesregierung für Kultur und Medien) for the federal government before returning to the publishing world. His most remembered act is declining the first design for the Memorial to the Murdered Jews of Europe in Berlin on grounds of its monumental abstraction, and choosing the second proposed design by Peter Eisenman instead, including an underground "Ort der Information", a place of information, which provides the visitors with introductory information on the history of the Holocaust.

=== Mayor candidate in Hamburg ===
In late 2007 Naumann became the official Social Democratic Party of Germany candidate for the mayor election in Hamburg 2008 on 24 February that year.

The 2008 election in Hamburg caused setbacks for the Social Democrats in advance. After a recent election in Hesse just a few weeks before, which failed to bring a majority to the Social Democrats, party head Kurt Beck left it open to local Social Democrats in West Germany to form local Minority government coalitions with the Greens and/or the FDP that would be tolerated by the emerging, controversial Left Party (in eastern parts of Germany, full-blown coalitions with the Left Party's predecessor PDS had been commonplace for years since German reunification in 1990 but always taboo in the West). The election in Hamburg was not far off when Beck made these ambiguous statements in favor of such minority coalitions tolerated by the Left Party, whereas before, he had utterly denied it.

This caused a huge controversy in the media in the final crucial week of the Hamburg election, overshadowing the issues of Naumann's campaign themes – social welfare, better education, and improvement of Hamburg's infrastructure. A specially pronounced issue Naumann dwelled on during his campaign was acceptance of referendums and honesty on behalf of the city's government, as incumbent conservative mayor Ole von Beust was known for having had ignored a number of referendums and lying about the issues they were involved with, especially selling off of community property to private investors, such as the city's public state hospitals and parts of the Hamburg harbor.

Beck's ambiguous statements about local co-operations with the Left Party forced Naumann to repeatedly and adamantly deny any co-operation with the Left Party after the elections no matter what election results would follow, even going so far as stigmatizing them as Soviet Communists several times during his campaign, repeating the line, "I will say it in a way even they will understand: Nyet!" ("Ich sage es ihnen so, daß es sogar die zahlreichen alten Freunde [...] von der KPD unter ihnen verstehen: Nyet!") Naumann could credibly do so, as he emphasized having escaped the Communist regime of East Germany as a child with his family, and also because of his treatment of these issues as a journalist, such as when he had been the editor-in-chief of the Leftist, but strictly anti-Communist political journal Der Monat (founded by Melvin J. Lasky) from 1978 until 1987. von Beust retorted Naumann's authenticity on the issue by saying that he believed Naumann's personal honest intention on not co-operating with the Left Party, but alleged that it wouldn't be up to Naumann in the end, rather to "more radical" figureheads in the SPD.

Presenting himself as a liberal and honest, cosmopolitan intellectual throughout his campaign, Naumann personally invited bad luck when he proved not the best orator in public and in TV interviews; a TV clip of him stumbling and stuttering when asked to deliver a particularly short yet concise message about his campaign promises was uploaded to YouTube numerous times. In above-mentioned interview, von Beust also mentioned a secret meeting between Berlin chapters of the SPD and the Left Party. Shortly thereafter, one reporter approached Naumann asking him whether he personally had been present at the meeting, to which Naumann indignantly swore "by the lives of my children" that he had not been there, which the media in turn generally took as a tasteless, pretentious kind of oath not to co-operate with the Left Party after the elections, even though Naumann had only spoken on whether he had been at that particular meeting. According to pollsters, approximately 3% of the crucial swing votes in the final week deserted the Social Democrats, and either stayed at home or switched to the conservatives. This deprived Naumann of the chances to form a coalition with the Greens.

Still, the election numbers in Hamburg were good for the Social Democrats. They gained 3% compared to 2004, and even about 10–15 percent compared to the polls made at the time when Naumann had been nominated as mayor candidate in late 2007. In fact, the only demographic that prevented Naumann from becoming mayor were senior citizens of 60 and older, which prompted Kurt Beck to say that the SPD would be "the coming force of the future" in Hamburg. Nevertheless, Naumann stuck to his promise not to form a coalition with the Left Party, or even just form a minority coalition with the Greens tolerated by the Left Party.

In the end Naumann's desired partners, the Greens sided with what they'd expressed as their second choice in advance, von Beust's conservative CDU, even though this prior announcement during their campaign had cost them 2.7%, dropping from 12.3% in the previous 2004 elections down to 9.6%. According to the Statistical Office of Hamburg and Schleswig-Holstein, almost all of the votes lost by the Greens went to the Left Party, in spite of Naumann's expressed appeal to the voters not to do so, repeatedly saying that "every single vote for the Left Party will be one more vote that will keep von Beust in office." ("Jede Stimme für die Linkspartei ist eine Stimme für den von-Beust-Senat.")

As he'd previously said, Naumann nonetheless took a seat in the SPD fraction of the Hamburg parliament directly after the elections that had taken place on 24 February. On 22 May he announced that he would resign from his seat on 15 June to go back to his former occupation as publisher of Die Zeit.

== Other activities ==
- Einstein Forum, Member of the Board of Trustees
- Jewish Museum Berlin, Member of the Board of Trustees
- Museum Berggruen, Member of the International Council

== Recognition ==
- 2006 – Julius Campe Prize
- 2018 – Order of Merit of the Federal Republic of Germany
