= Warburg family =

German-American banking dynasty

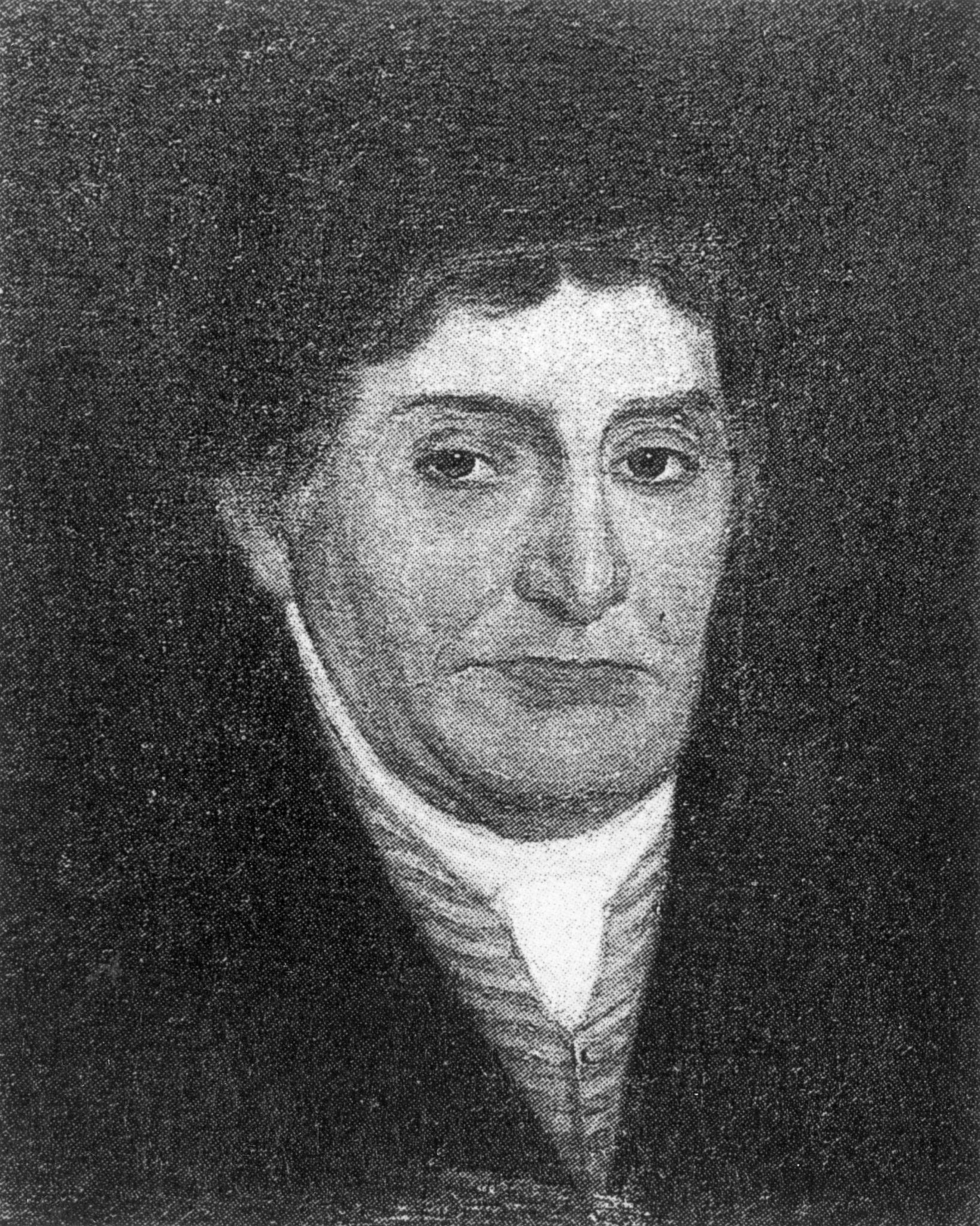
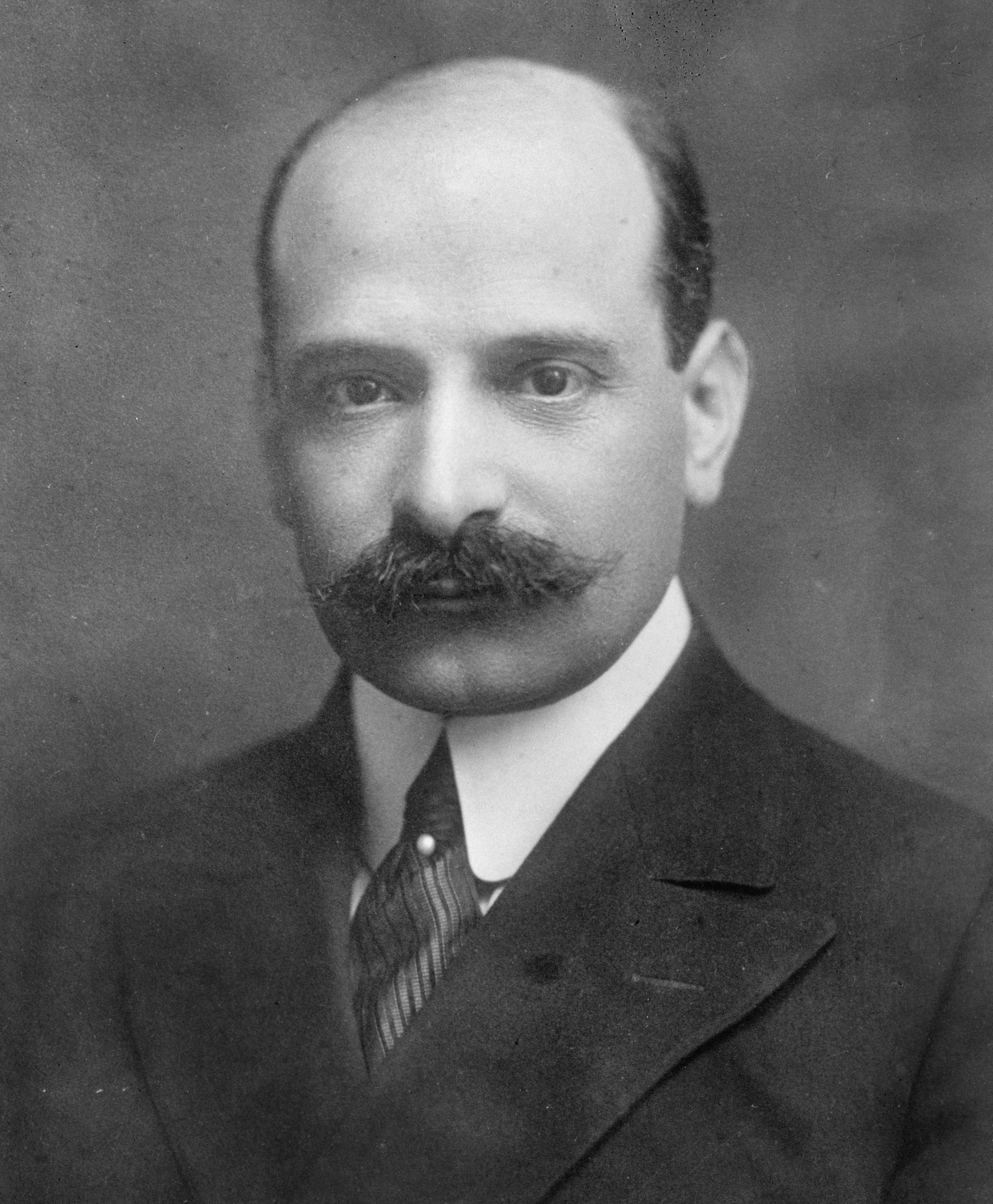
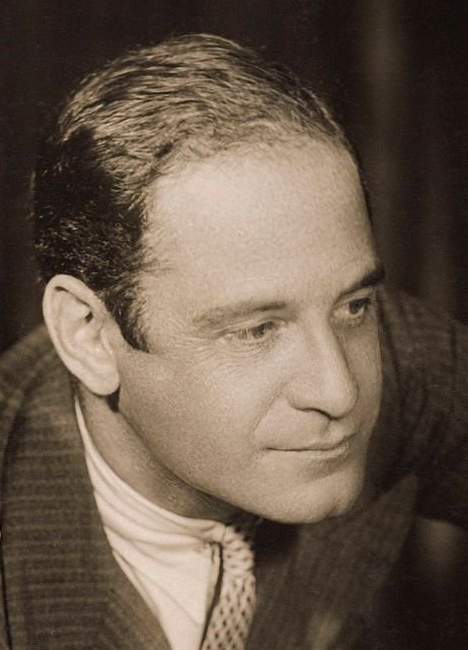
- Moses Marcus Warburg Paul Moritz Warburg James Paul Warburg
- Current region: Hamburg, Germany; New York, U.S.
- Origin: Warburg, Germany
- Founded: c. 1500s
- Founder: Gumprich Marcus Warburg
- Connected families: Astor family; Schiff family

The Warburg family is a prominent German and American banking family. They are noted for their varied accomplishments in biochemistry, botany, political activism, economics, investment banking, law, physics, classical music, art history, pharmacology, physiology, finance, private equity and philanthropy.

It has been suggested that the family originated as the early 16th century, wealthy Venetian-Jewish family, known in Hebrew as Meshullam and in Italian as del Banco.. There is however very little evidence for this claim.

Due to restrictions limiting Jewish involvement in banking, they moved to Bologna, and thence to Warburg, in Westphalia, in the 16th century, after which they later took their name. The first known ancestor was Simon von Kassel (1500–1566).

The family later established itself in Altona, near Hamburg in the 17th century, after the Thirty Years' War, and it was in Hamburg that M. M. Warburg & Co. was established in 1798, among the oldest still existing investment banks in the world. Other banks created by members of the family include Warburg Pincus and S. G. Warburg & Co., the latter having been acquired in 1995 by UBS.

== Family organization ==
=== Alsterufer and Mittelweg lines ===
The family is traditionally divided into two prominent lines, the Alsterufer Warburgs and the Mittelweg Warburgs. The Alsterufer Warburgs descended from Siegmund Warburg (1835–1889) and the Mittelweg Warburgs descended from his brother Moritz M. Warburg (1838–1910). They took their nicknames from the brothers' respective addresses in Hamburg's Rotherbaum neighborhood. The brothers were grandsons of Moses Marcus Warburg.

Siegmund George Warburg was of the Alsterufer lines; the five brothers Abraham (Aby) M., Max M., Paul M., Felix M. and Fritz Moritz Warburg were of the Mittelweg line.

The brothers Moses Marcus Warburg (1763–1830) and Gerson Warburg (1765–1826) founded the M. M. Warburg & Co. banking company in 1798. Moses Warburg's great-great grandson, Siegmund George Warburg, founded the investment bank S. G. Warburg & Co in London in 1946. Siegmund's second cousin, Eric Warburg, founded Warburg Pincus in New York in 1938. Eric Warburg's son Max Warburg Jr. (not to be confused with Eric's father Max Warburg) is currently one of the three partners of M.M.Warburg & Co., Warburg. Max Warburg's elder brother Aby Warburg used family resources to establish the Kulturwissenschaftliche Bibliothek Warburg in Hamburg, since 1934 The Warburg Institute in London. Paul Warburg is most famous as an architect of the US Federal Reserve System, established in 1913. Paul was a member of the first Federal Reserve Board, and its Vice Chairman until his resignation in August 1918.

=== American and German Warburgs ===
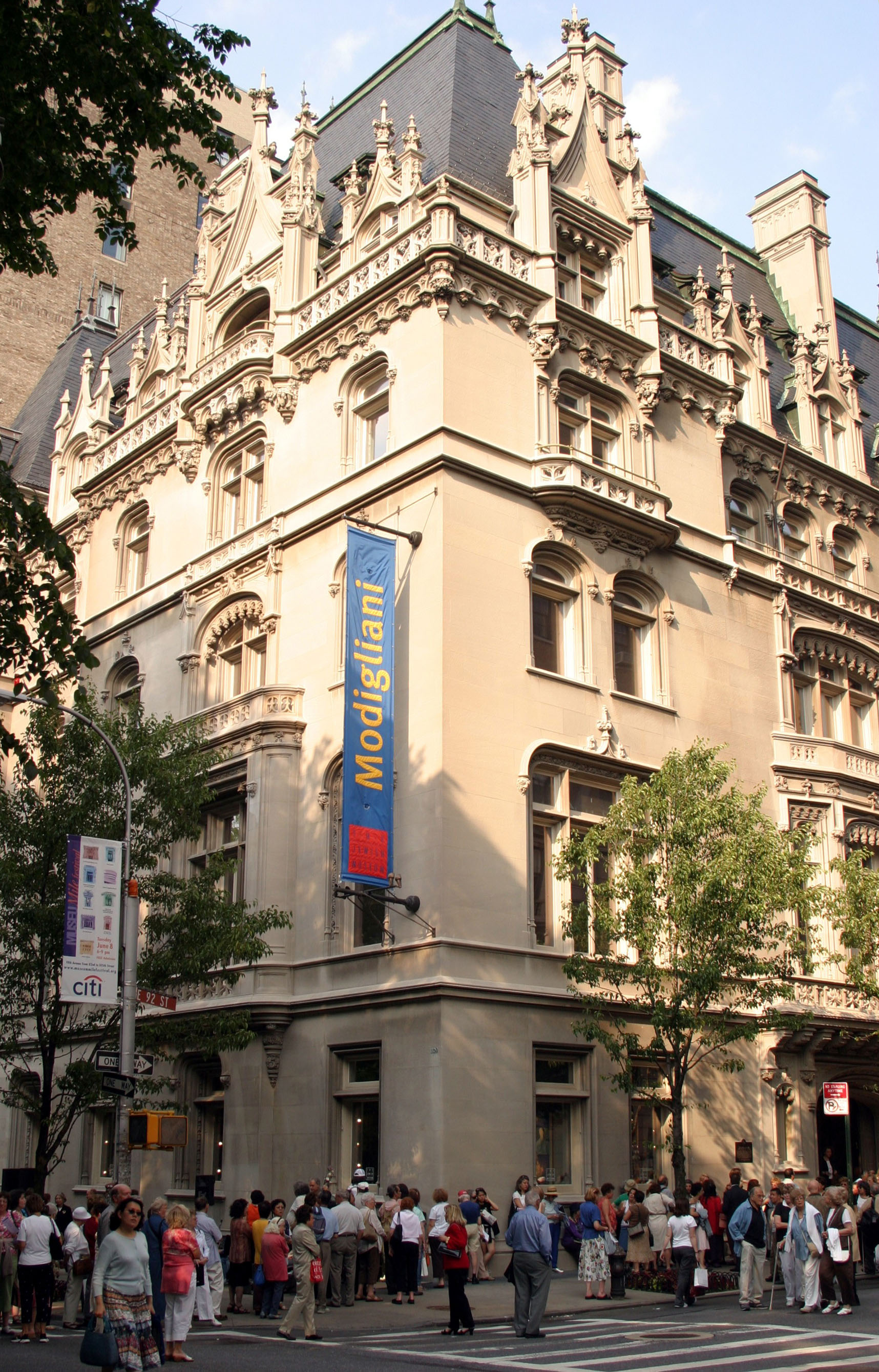
The former Felix M. Warburg House in Manhattan, New York City

Felix and Paul Warburg emigrated to the United States. There they became the two mainstays of the American branch, out of the five German born Warburg brothers. The brothers worked out of New York City where nearly all the male members formed a close bond with the Kuhn, Loeb & Co. investment banking firm. An American based, but internationally sound firm which at one time toyed with creating a branch abroad that was presumed would operate most efficiently with the aid of the families international connections. While in NYC, Felix Warburg married Frieda Schiff, only daughter of Jacob H. Schiff, a banker who grew up in Frankfurt and had ties to the German Warburgs. Schiff financed most of the American rail system through his investment bank of Kuhn, Loeb & Co. and interacted with newly American Warburgs, as brothers Felix and Paul each eventually made senior partner for, and each married into some of the prominent families with the investment banking firm of Kuhn, Loeb & Co., at the time, run by Schiff. Beginning with the marriage of Jacob Schiff in 1875 to Therese Loeb, a daughter of co-founder Solomon Loeb, becoming a full partner in the business firm shortly after.

In 1895, Paul Warburg married Nina Loeb, daughter of Solomon Loeb of Kuhn, Loeb & Co., having met her at the wedding of brother Felix Warburg, who had married Jacob Schiff's daughter, Frieda. But originally it was founding partner Abraham Kuhn who concentrated the family wealth and cemented business relations with newly immigrated distant cousin Solomon Loeb by his marriage to Kuhn's sister. Shortly thereafter the two became full partners in their newly established New York banking investment firm of, Kuhn, Loeb & Co. In more recent times Schiff's great-great grandson Drew previously was married to Al Gore's daughter, Karenna, who has risen in place at the Union Theological Seminary. UTS shares a partnership with the Jewish Theological Seminary, each located in NYC in Manhattan, where the JTS has historically been associated as well, with the Jewish Museum.

Having ties to America and Germany like many other prominent Jewish financial families, the Warburgs abroad maintained close ties to their Jewish roots. The Felix M. Warburg House in New York City is now the Jewish Museum, and Kfar Warburg in Israel is named for him. Otto Warburg, a cousin of the German-based Warburgs was a wealthy botanist who was elected head of the World Zionist Organization in 1911. Felix's brother, Paul Warburg was one of the original founders of the board of the U.S. Federal Reserve System, a collection of 12 regional Reserve Banks headed by a Board of Governors which regulates and oversees private commercial banks. As one of the most prominent bankers of his time, his brother Max Warburg attended the Paris Peace Conference of 1919 at Versailles, as part of the German delegation.

During the Weimar Republic, Max Warburg served on the board ('Generalrat') of the Reichsbank from 1924 to 1933, under two successive chairmen, Hjalmar Schacht, (until 1930), and Hans Luther (1930–1933); until 1934, he was also on the Board of the Bankenverband. Max Warburg emigrated in 1938. In the 1920s and 1930s, until the end of the Weimar Republic in 1933, Max Warburg also served on several Supervisory Boards ("Aufsichtsrat") in industry, notably HAPAG, Blohm &Voss, Beiersdorf, and, until his resignation in 1932, as a member of the Supervisory Board ("Aufsichtsrat") of the German conglomerate/ chemical firm known as IG Farben (Interessen Gemeinschaft Farben). His brother Paul Warburg, who died in January 1932 – a year before Hitler was elected Chancellor – also served on numerous Supervisory Boards ("Aufsichtsrat") including allegedly that of an I.G. Farben wholly owned US subsidiary.

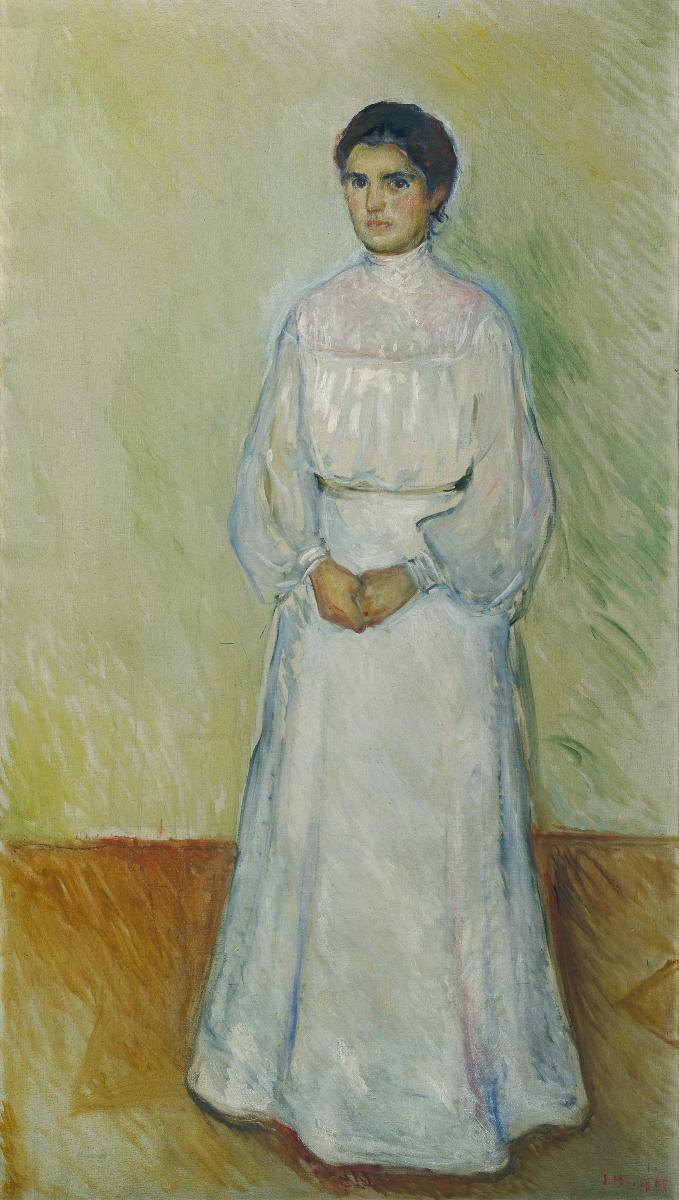
Portrait of Ellen Warburg by Edvard Munch, 1905.

Most members of the German Warburg family had fled to the United States or Great Britain by the end of 1938. However, Max Warburg's brother, Fritz Warburg, who was preparing his exile in Sweden, was arrested by the Gestapo in Hamburg in early November 1938 and spent some months in prison before he could leave for Stockholm in May 1939. His daughter Eva came to organize the emigration for 500 German Jewish children from Germany and Austria to Sweden in 1938 and 1939. Also, three cousins, mother, Gerta and daughters Betty and Helene Julie (Burchard) Warburg, stayed in Altona. Gerta and Betty were murdered in the Sobibor extermination camp in 1940 and Helena Julie in Auschwitz in 1942. A life size portrait of Helene Julie by the Norwegian artist Edvard Munch today hangs in the Kunsthaus in Zurich (The Lady in White). Eric Warburg, son of Max Warburg, returned to Germany as an officer (colonel) in the American Air Force and was influential in restoring German-Jewish relations and rebuilding Germany's economic ties after the Second World War through his international business associations. Eric's son, also called Max, is currently a partner in M.M. Warburg & Co. in Hamburg.

=== Venetian origins ===
The Warburg family is thought to have originated from Venice, at which point they bore the surname del-Banco. The historical documents describe Anselmo del Banco as Jewish and as having been one of the wealthiest residents of Venice in the early 16th century. In 1513, del Banco was granted a charter by the Venetian government permitting the lending of money with interest. Del Banco left with his family after new restrictions were placed upon the Jewish community coinciding with the establishment of the Venetian Ghetto. The family settled in Bologna, and from there to the German town of Warburg, and adopted that town's name as their own surname, after having moved to Hamburg after the Thirty Years' War.

== Noteworthy members ==
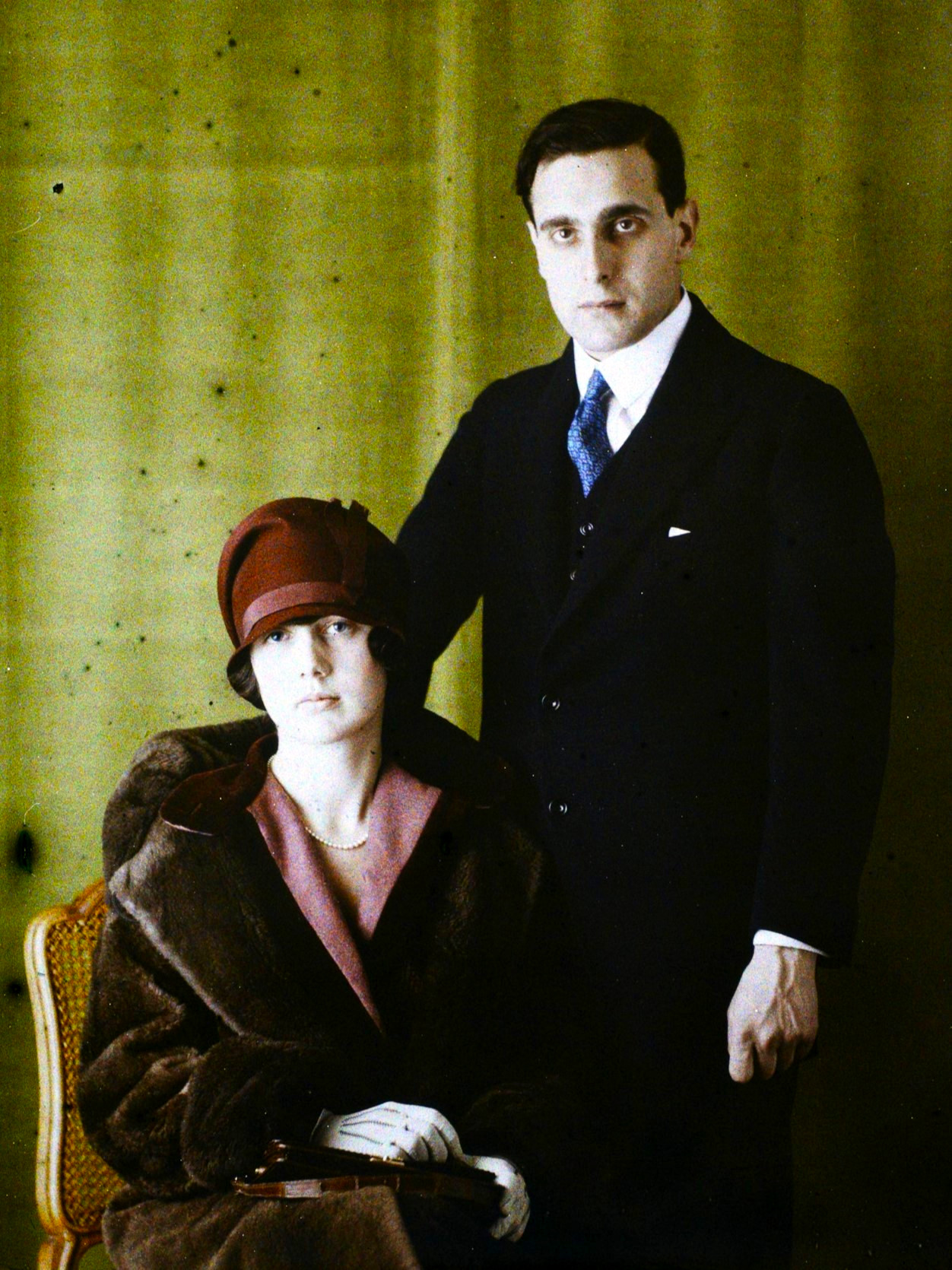
Autochrome of Sir Siegmund Warburg with his wife Eva Maria Warburg, by Georges Chevalier, 1926.

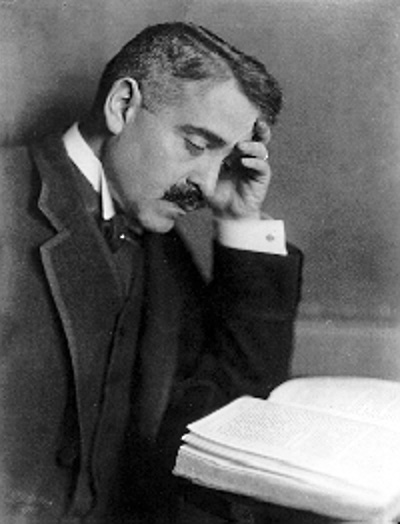
Aby Warburg

- Moses Marcus Warburg (1763–1830), founder, with his brother Gerson Warburg (1765–1825), of M. M. Warburg & Co. in 1798.
  - Sara Warburg (1805–1884) married to Abraham Samuel Warburg (1798–1856), her cousin
    - Rosa Warburg (1833–1908), married to Paul Schiff, director of the Creditanstalt of Vienna
    - Siegmund Warburg (1835–1889), married to Théophilie Rosenberg
      - Abraham Samuel Warburg (1864–1933)
      - Georg Gabriel Warburg (1871–1923), married to Lucie Lea Kaulla
        - Siegmund George Warburg (1902–1982), founder of S. G. Warburg & Co, London, married to Eva Maria Philipson, daughter of Mauritz Philipson
          - Georg Albert Siegmund Warburg (1927–2023), married to Elinor Bliss Bozyan (1932–2014)
            - Daniel Warburg
            - Michael Warburg
            - John Warburg
    - Moritz M. Warburg (1838–1910), married to Charlotte Oppenheim
      - Abraham (Aby) M. Warburg (1866–1929), German art historian
      - Max M. Warburg (1867–1946), banker
        - Eric M. Warburg (1900–1990), founder of Warburg Pincus, married to Dorothea Thorsch (1912–2003), daughter of Alfons Thorsch
          - Max M. Warburg Jr. (b. 1948)
          - Marie Warburg, married to Michael Naumann (b. 1941), journalist
          - Erica Warburg
      - Paul M. Warburg (1868–1932), father of the Federal Reserve, married Nina Loeb (1863–1912) in 1895, the daughter of Solomon Loeb
        - James Warburg (1897–1969), economist, banker, advisor to Franklin D. Roosevelt, married to Kay Swift (1897–1993)
          - Andrea Swift Warburg (1922–2009), married to Sidney Kaufman.
            - Katharine Kaufman Weber (b. 1955), novelist, married to Nicholas Fox Weber.
        - Bettina Warburg (1900–1990) psychiatrist.
      - Katharine Warburg (1870–1935), married to Isaac Dorfman (1868–1929), philanthropist, banker.
      - Felix M. Warburg (1871–1937), New York banker with Kuhn, Loeb & Co., philanthropist, married Frieda Schiff (1876–1958), daughter of Jacob H. Schiff and granddaughter of Solomon Loeb in 1895.
        - Carola Warburg Rothschild (1896–1987), married to Walter N. Rothschild, son of Simon F. Rothschild
          - Walter N. Rothschild Jr.
          - Phyllis Rothschild Peters Farley
          - Carol Rothschild Bradford Noyes, married Amory Howe Bradford (d. 1998), son of Arthur Howe Bradford; married 1965 to diplomat Charles P. Noyes
            - David A. Bradford
            - Carola Bradford Lea
            - Madhavi Bradford
            - Deborah Bradford
            - Peter A. Bradford, married Katherine Bradford
              - Arthur Bradford
              - Laura Rothschild Bradford Kirkpatrick
        - Frederick Marcus Warburg (1897–1973), married to Wilma L. Shannon
        - Gerald Felix Warburg (1901–1971), well-known cellist and conductor, married Natica Nast (1905–1987), daughter of Condé Nast
          - Felix Max Warburg (1924–2019), architect and environmental leader, married to Sandol Milliken Stoddard (1927–2018) and Sue Rosenthal (1930–2014)
          - Geraldine Warburg Kohlenberg Zetzel, married to Arthur Kohlenberg (1924–1970) and Louis Zetzel (1909–1993)
          - Jeremy Warburg, married to William Russo
            - Alexander William Warburg Russo (b. 1964), writer
          - Jonathan F. Warburg
        - Paul Felix Warburg (c.1904–1965)
        - Edward Warburg (1908–1992), philanthropist and benefactor of the arts, married to Mary Warburg (1908–2009)
          - David J. Warburg, married Caroline Susan MacDonald
            - Ian Edward Warburg (b. 1962 or 1963), married to Jane Green (1968–) author, philanthropist.
          - Daphne Warburg (b. 1949), married to Michael Ramon Langhorne Astor, eldest son of Jakie Astor.
      - Olga Warburg (1872–1895)
      - Fritz M. Warburg (1879–1964) living in Stockholm during World War I and II, father of Eva Warburg who organized Kindertransport to Sweden in 1938 and -39.
      - Louisa Warburg (1879–1973), married to Julius Derenberg (1873–1928)
        - Walter Julius Derenberg (1903–1975), legal scholar

Relatives

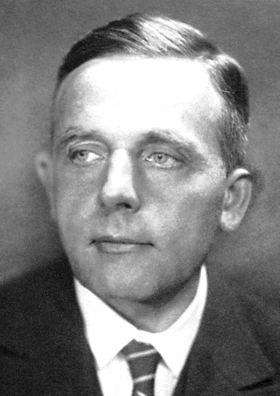
Otto Heinrich Warburg, 1931

- Emil Warburg, (1846–1931), German physicist
- Otto Heinrich Warburg (1883–1970), physiologist and biochemist (Nobel prize in Medicine, 1931)
- Otto Warburg (1859–1938), botanist and president of the World Zionist Organization

== See also ==
- M. M. Warburg & Co.
- Warburg Pincus
- S. G. Warburg & Co.
- Kuhn, Loeb & Co.
- Warburg Institute
- Rothschild family
