= Hugh Stevenson (investment banker) =

Sir Hugh Stevenson
- Born: 7 September 1942 (age 83)
- Education: Harrow; University College, Oxford
- Occupation: Investment banker
- Known for: Chairman, Mercury Asset Management, 1992-1998

Sir Hugh Alexander Stevenson (born 7 September 1942) is a businessman known for being a former chairman of Mercury Asset Management and Equitas.

== Career ==
Stevenson began his career at law firm Linklaters and Paine before joining S.G. Warburg & Co. in 1970. He went on to become chairman of Mercury Asset Management from 1992 to 1998. Stevenson was on the board of Warburg from 1987 to 1995, at which point it was bought by SBC and its ties with Mercury Asset Management were severed.

As Chairman of Mercury Asset Management, Stevenson oversaw the company’s sale to Merrill Lynch in late 1997, which saw Mercury colleagues Carol Galley and Stephen Zimmerman become co-heads of the newly created Merrill Lynch Investment Management (MLIM).

Following his departure from Mercury Asset Management in 1998, Stevenson took on the chairmanship of Equitas, the company that was set up to reinsure the liabilities of over 30,000 “Names” of Lloyd’s of London insurance syndicates. He remained chairman of Equitas through to the transfer of liabilities in 2009. He was knighted for services to the financial services industry in the 2010 Birthday Honours list.

Other non-executive directorships that Stevenson held following his departure from Mercury included a position on the board of Standard Life Investments from 1999 through to 2008, the last four years of which he was non-executive chairman. He held other non-executive directorships at Standard Life plc (2006-2008); Merchants Trust (1999-2010), which he chaired; and the Financial Services Authority (2004-2010).

Stevenson was also a director of the British Museum Company, which oversees the running of the British Museum for 15 years from 1991 to 2006.
