= Peter Stormonth Darling =

British investment banker (1932–2019)

- Born: 29 September 1932
- Died: 16 September 2019 (aged 86)
- Education: New College, Oxford
- Occupations: Investment banker, Chairman of Mercury Asset Management

Peter Stormonth Darling (29 September 1932 – 16 September 2019) was a British investment banker who was the chairman of Mercury Asset Management.

Darling was raised on his family estate, Balvarran, in Strathardle, near Blairgowrie, Scotland. His father, Patrick, was a Scottish barrister, and his mother, Edith, was Irish. Educated at Winchester College, he was a strong cricketer, playing in the First XI in 1948 and 1949. His National service was in the Black Watch, extended to include service in Korea and the Second Battle of the Hook.

Darling studied law at New College, Oxford, then moved to Canada where he worked for Siegmund George Warburg from 1957 to 1963. In 1979 Peter Stormonth Darling was appointed chairman of Warburg Investment Management which was renamed Mercury Asset Management. As chairman from 1979 to 1992 he oversaw its growth as it became, at the time, the largest and most influential fund-management firm in the UK with over £100 billion under management.

In retirement, he was actively engaged in historic preservation; for example, chairing the World Monuments Fund from 2007 to 2009, having joined the board in 1998. His charitable work in Scotland focussed on social welfare, health and sport. The Peter Stormonth Darling Charitable Trust supports charitable organisations carrying out social welfare activities in the UK and in particular, those involved in the arts, sports, heritage, education and medical progress.

His nephew Lorne, son of his brother Robin, was married to actress Honeysuckle Weeks.

== Works ==
- Stormonth Darling, Peter (7 October 1999). City Cinderella : the life and times of Mercury Asset Management. Weidenfeld & Nicolson. p. 320. ISBN 9780297643906.
