= Henry Grunfeld =

Merchant banker

- Born: Heinrich Grünfeld; 1 June 1904; Breslau, Silesia, German Empire
- Died: 10 June 1999 (aged 95); London, England
- Occupation: Merchant banker

Henry Grunfeld (1 June 1904 – 10 June 1999) was a merchant banker who played a prominent role in the development of investment banking and the growth of London as a financial centre following the Second World War.

Grunfeld was co-founder of S.G. Warburg, which became the preeminent UK-based investment bank by the early 1990s and "the biggest force in post-world-war merchant banking". While the firm had been named after his colleague Siegmund Warburg, whose family were already long established in banking in Germany and the United States, upon Grunfeld's death it was noted that "Warburg, Grunfeld and Company would have been the more accurate style".

== Career ==
Grunfeld was born in Breslau in the Prussian Province of Silesia (today Wrocław, Poland) to an assimilated Jewish family with longstanding interests in the steel and chemicals industries. He was educated in Breslau and Berlin. Grunfeld became prominent in the German Steel Industry at the age of just 20 after his father's death forced him to take over the operations of the family steel piping business, A. Niederstetter. He subsequently represented the German Steel Industry in its negotiations with the Weimar government. Later, Grunfeld had to confront critical problems posed by the aftermath of hyperinflation, industrial unrest and world depression following the Wall Street crash of 1929. At the age of 27 he became closely involved in the aftermath of the 1931 banking crisis, serving on more than 20 creditor committees.

In April 1934, following the rise of Hitler, Grunfeld was arrested by the Gestapo without warrant or charge and jailed for fifty-four hours. He was able to use his status as an honorary Consul of Spain to avoid deportation to a concentration camp and fled to London with his family shortly after the Night of the Long Knives. His family business became the subject of Aryanization and was plundered by the Nazis, and after the application of the various Nazi capital flight taxes and exchange controls, almost all Grunfeld's personal assets were also confiscated: he arrived in the United Kingdom with £4,000 (equal to just 7.5% of his company's original book value at the time of its founding in 1898). Many members of his family remained in Germany and were killed during the Third Reich. While Grunfeld was later highly active with post-war German industrial companies, he never returned to Berlin and made no post-war restitution claim.

== Establishment of S.G. Warburg & Co. ==
Exiled in London, after a period of operating an independent factoring business, Grunfeld joined forces with Siegmund Warburg in the New Trading Company, which was established to help refugees from Europe extract their money from their native country and invest it safely. After the outbreak of war, Grunfeld successfully avoided internment as an enemy alien by leaving his home every morning at 7am and walking around Hyde Park—it was thought that the police typically made their arrests between 8am and 9am. He was exempted from internment as an enemy alien in October 1939 and became a British subject in 1946.

The New Trading Company was renamed as S.G. Warburg & Co. in 1946 and Grunfeld and Warburg developed its merchant banking business among emigrants to London, and in Germany. S.G. Warburg rose to international prominence after it pioneered the hostile takeover in the UK with the acquisition of British Aluminium by Reynolds and Tube Investments in 1959. The firm grew rapidly after it developed the Eurobond market after 1963, the initial security being a £10 million loan to the Italian toll-road builder Autostrade Italiane. Grunfeld was especially active with clients in the newspaper industry and in the establishment of commercial television in the UK. He pioneered the reverse takeover in a transaction for Lord Thomson. From 3 employees in 1937, S.G. Warburg had 15,000 employees in 40 countries and had half of the FTSE 100 largest UK companies among its clients at the time of its acquisition by Swiss Bank Corporation in 1995. Grunfeld had taken over chairmanship of the firm in 1964 and held it for 10 years. He remained active in the firm until his death in 1999, aged 95. He rarely gave interviews but in 1987 publicly warned that derivatives could be the cause of a future financial crisis.

At S.G. Warburg, Grunfeld pioneered the use of graphology as an employee selection tool in the UK. Outside the firm, he was an unofficial adviser to Harold Wilson's government.

Following his death the Henry Grunfeld Chaired Professorship in Investment Banking was established at INSEAD, the European business school, currently occupied by Gabriel Hawawini, and the Henry Grunfeld Foundation was established at The London Institute of Banking & Finance.
