= Hambro Magan =

Defunct British private equity firm

- Company type: Private
- Industry: Finance
- Headquarters: London, United Kingdom

Hambro Magan was a London-based private equity firm from 1988 to 1996.

== History ==
The firm was co-founded by Rupert Hambro, George Magan, Baron Magan of Castletown and Alton Irby III in 1988.

It had 40 employees, including Sir Michael Richardson. According to The Wall Street Journal, the firm "advised Rhone-Poulenc Rorer on its 1.8 billion pound acquisition of Fisons PLC, Swiss Bank Corp. on its 860 million pound acquisition of S.G. Warburg & Co. and United News & Media on its 2.9 billion pound merger with MAI PLC."

It was acquired by NatWest Markets in 1996.
