= Carol Galley =

British fund manager and businesswoman

- Born: 1948 (age 77–78); Sheffield, South Yorkshire, England
- Occupations: Fund manager and businesswoman
- Years active: 1971-2001
- Spouse: Reinhard Winkler

Carol Galley is a businesswoman who, as a director of Mercury Asset Management, was regarded as the most powerful woman in the City of London in the 1990s.

== Early life ==
Her father was Kenneth Galley, who was chief executive of Newcastle City Council in the 1970s.

She was educated at Gosforth Grammar School in Newcastle upon Tyne and then graduated from the University of Leicester with a degree in modern languages (German).

== Career ==
Galley joined Mercury Asset Management (then part of merchant bank S.G. Warburg) in 1971 as a librarian/researcher. She rose rapidly through the ranks in a male-dominated industry, becoming a director and key figure. She co-led Mercury (alongside Stephen Zimmerman) during its golden era in the 1980s and 1990s, when it grew to manage billions in pension funds and became one of Britain's leading investment firms. During that time she played a prominent role in high-profile takeovers, including Granada plc's acquisitions of London Weekend Television (1994) and the Forte Group (1996).

Following Merrill Lynch's £3.1 billion acquisition of Mercury in 1997, she became co-head/joint COO of Merrill Lynch Investment Managers (MLIM). She no longer actively makes fund management decisions. She featured on the 2006 Sunday Times Rich List with a personal wealth of £80 million.
