= 450 Lexington Avenue =

Office building in Manhattan, New York

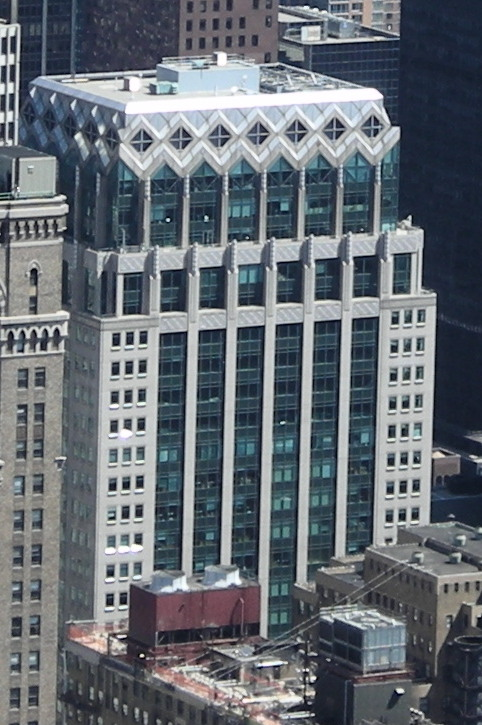
- Interactive map of the 450 Lexington Avenue area

General information
- Status: Completed
- Type: Commercial
- Location: 450 Lexington Avenue; Manhattan, New York City, United States
- Coordinates: 40.753268°N 73.975443°W
- Completed: 1992
- Owner: RXR Realty

Height
- Height: 173 metres (568 ft)

Technical details
- Floor count: 38
- Floor area: 910,273 square feet (84,567 m^{2})

Design and construction
- Architects: Warren and Wetmore (Original structure); Skidmore, Owings, and Merrill (New tower)

450 Lexington Avenue is a 38-story office building on Lexington Avenue, between East 44th and 45th Streets, in the East Midtown neighborhood of Manhattan in New York City. The building, which was built in 1992, is clad in Sardinian gray granite and features a repeating diamond motif that highlights the building setbacks and its crown. The stone used in the building was quarried direct at source in Italy and tested by Cawdor Ramsey prior to shipment to New York and the subsequent installation.

The tower was built within and on top of the preexisting Grand Central Post Office, which was designed by Warren and Wetmore and constructed from 1906 to 1909. It was originally developed by Hines after anchor tenant and original developer Prudential Financial backed out of the project. It was ultimately developed by Sterling Equities and still stands below the modern skyscraper.

The building was owned by Istithmar World from 2006 to 2012, and has been owned by RXR Realty since 2012. Istithmar purchased 450 Lexington in 2006 but refinanced the property the following year for $600 million. Current tenants include Brixmor Property Group, Davis Polk & Wardwell, Warburg Pincus, and WeWork.

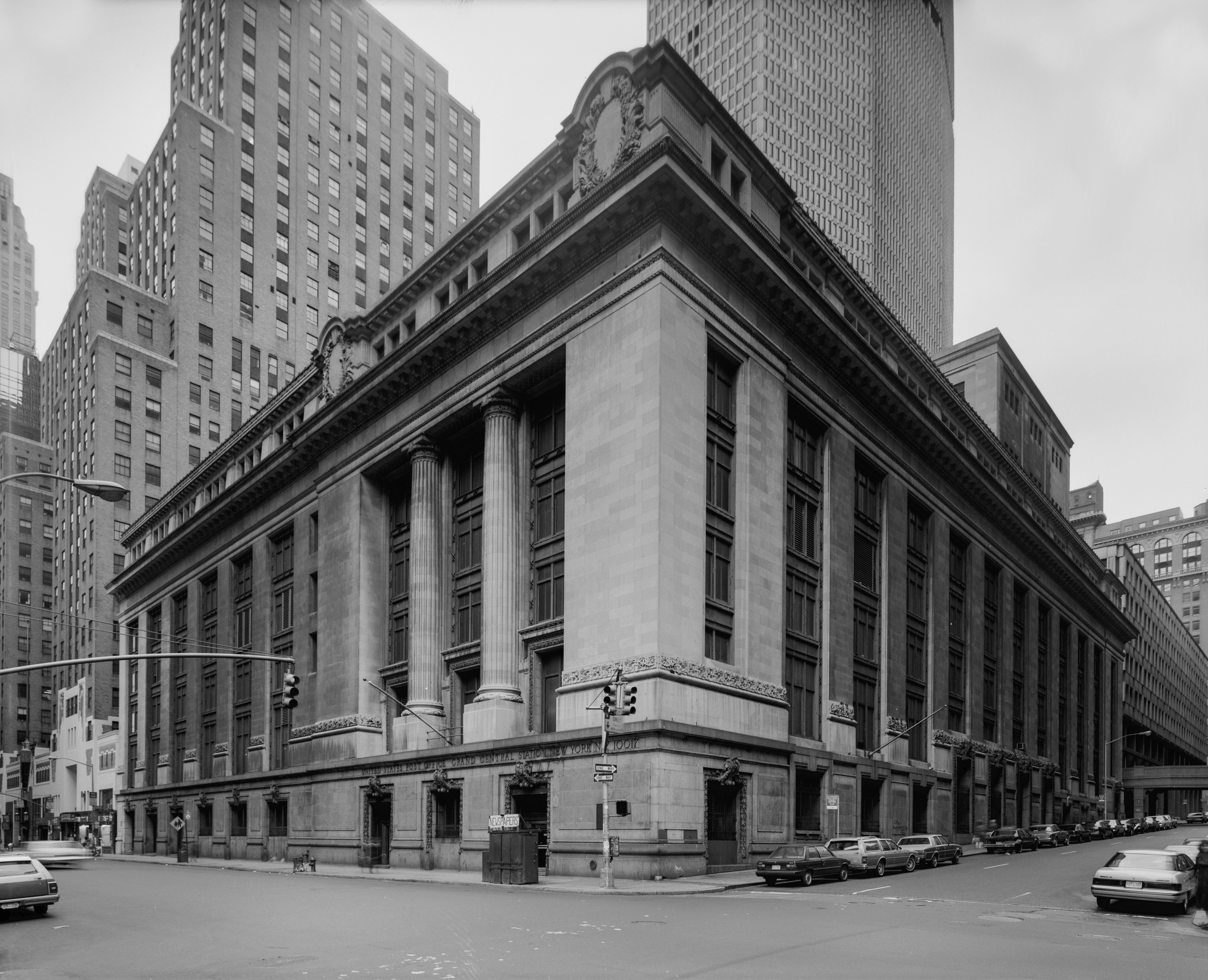
The original building

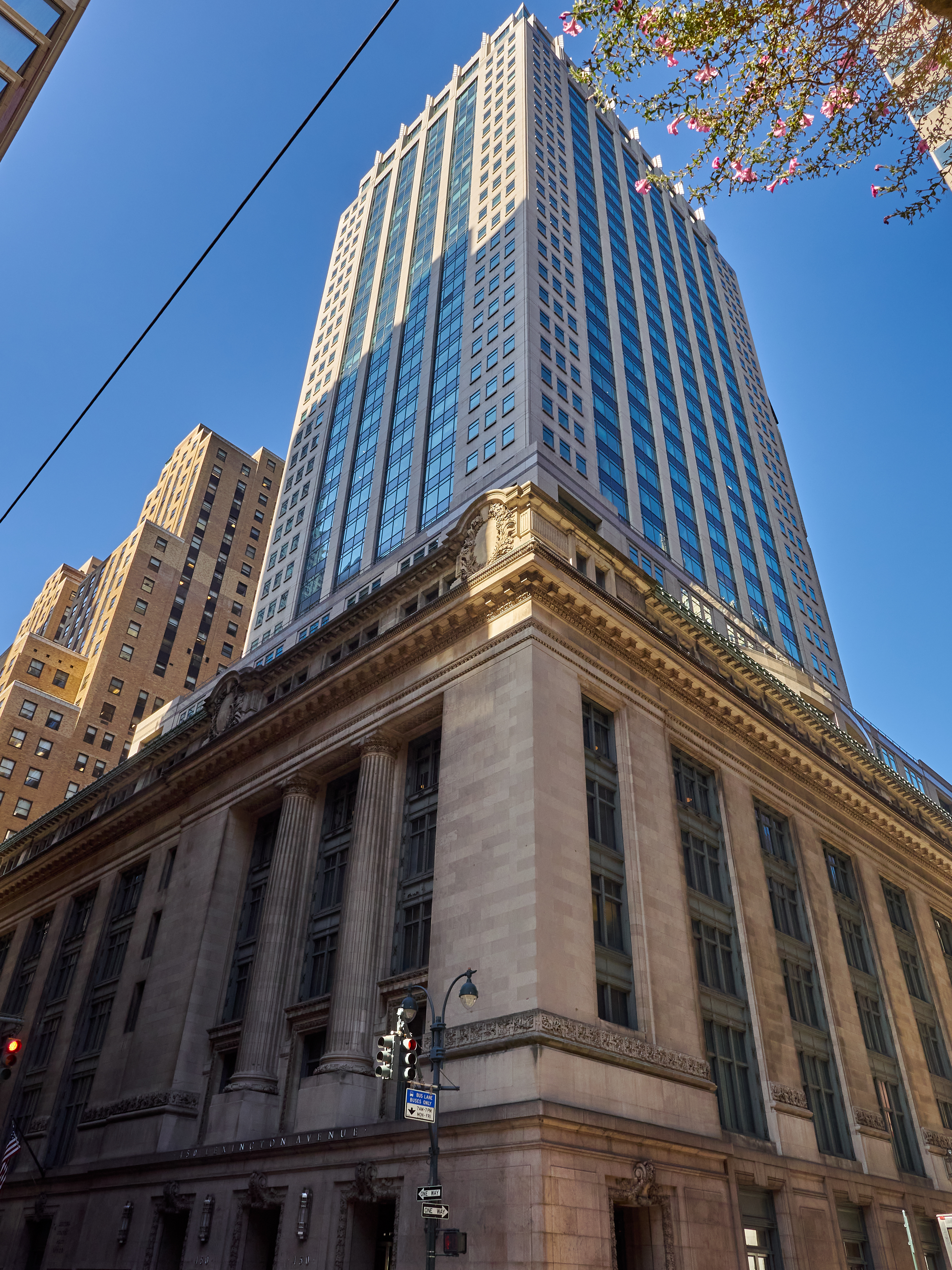
The tower atop the former post office building
