= Michael Cohrs =

American financier

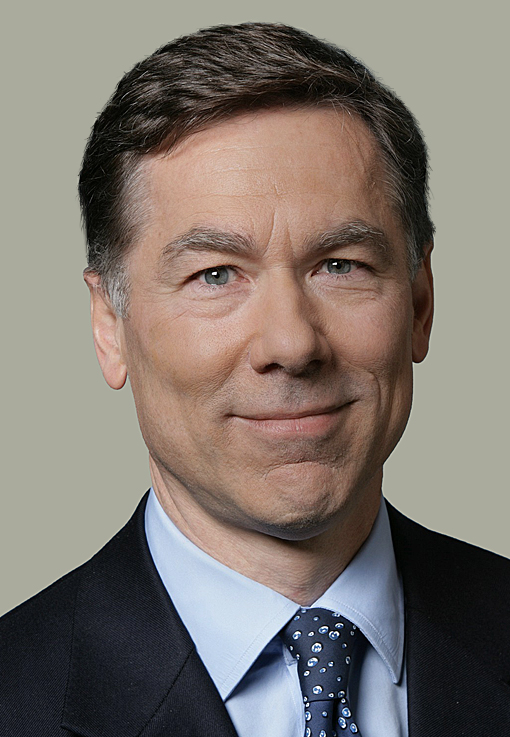
- Born: 1956 (age 69–70); Midland, Michigan
- Education: Harvard Business School (M.B.A.); Harvard College (B.A.)
- Occupation: Financier

Michael Cohrs (born 1956 in Midland, Michigan) is an American financier. He was co-head of corporate and investment banking and head of global banking (which comprises the mergers and acquisitions, global capital markets, coverage, commercial banking and global transaction banking businesses) at Deutsche Bank. He was also a member of the group executive committee and the management board. He retired from Deutsche Bank in September 2010.

Cohrs holds a B.A. from Harvard College (1979) and a M.B.A. from Harvard Business School (1981). In 1981 he started his career at Goldman Sachs in New York, and was sent to London in 1989. Between 1991 and 1995 he served as a director at S. G. Warburg & Co. He was recruited by Deutsche Bank and played a leading role in building its corporate and investment bank.

In November 2009 Cohrs was appointed an adjunct professor at Peking University in Beijing.

In 2011 Cohrs was appointed by the Chancellor of the Exchequer to the Financial Policy Committee and by the British Crown to the Court (board of directors) at the Bank of England.

In January 2012 he was appointed as an advisor to EQT in Sweden.
