= Max Warburg =

Jewish banker (1867–1946)

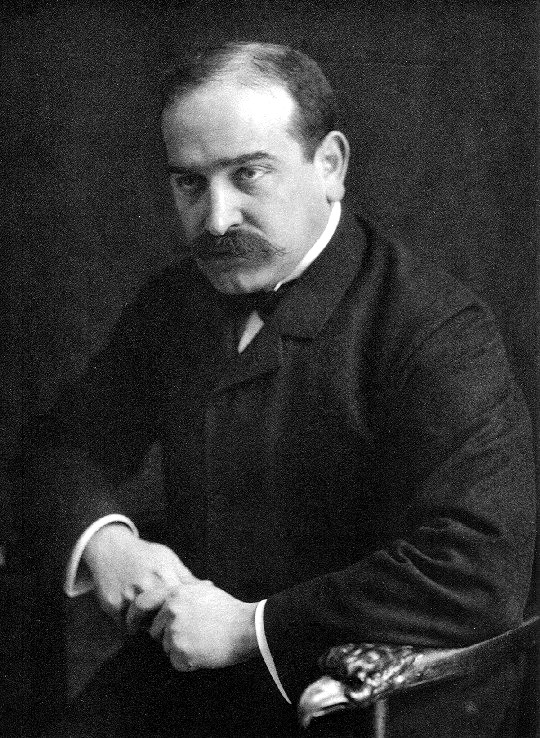
- Max Warburg in 1904; by Rudolf Dührkoop
- Born: Max Moritz Warburg; June 5, 1867; Hamburg, Germany
- Died: December 26, 1946 (aged 79); New York City
- Occupation: Banker
- Spouse: Alice Magnus (m. 1899)
- Children: Eric Warburg (1900–1990)

Max Moritz Warburg (5 June 1867 – 26 December 1946) was a German banker and scion of the wealthy Warburg family based in Hamburg, Germany.

== Early life ==
Max Warburg was one of seven children born to Moritz Warburg, the director of the family's Hamburg bank, and his wife Charlotte Oppenheim of the Oppenheim family, another prominent Jewish German banking family.

His siblings were art historian and cultural theorist Abraham “Aby” Warburg; chief architect of the Federal Reserve Board of the United States Paul Warburg; Felix, son-in-law to Jacob Schiff and partner at Kuhn, Loeb & Co.; Fritz; Olga; and Louisa.

== Career ==
He apprenticed in Frankfurt, Amsterdam, Paris, and London. From 1910 until 1938, he was director of M. M. Warburg & Co. in Hamburg, Germany. As head of that firm, he advised Kaiser Wilhelm II prior to World War I.

In the 1930s, despite the rise of the Nazi Party, Warburg felt there was hope for the future in Germany and tried to wait out the Nazi crisis. From 1933, he served on the board of the German Reichsbank under governor Hjalmar Schacht. He sold the bank because the 1935 Nuremberg laws set the framework and campaign of Aryanization. He then emigrated to the United States in 1938.

== Personal life ==
Max Warburg married Alice Magnus in 1899, and together they had four daughters (including Lola Helene Nina Hahn-Warburg (1901 - 1989), who instigated the Kindertransport initiative to the United Kingdom) and a son, Eric Warburg (1900–1990), who served during WW2 and was later involved with the OSS, along with founding E.M. Warburg & Co, later known as Warburg Pincus. His company did deals on Wall Street with help of people like Alan Dulles, and he maintained a close relationship with John J. McCloy over the years.

== See also ==
- Warburg family
