= Gabriel Hawawini =

French economist

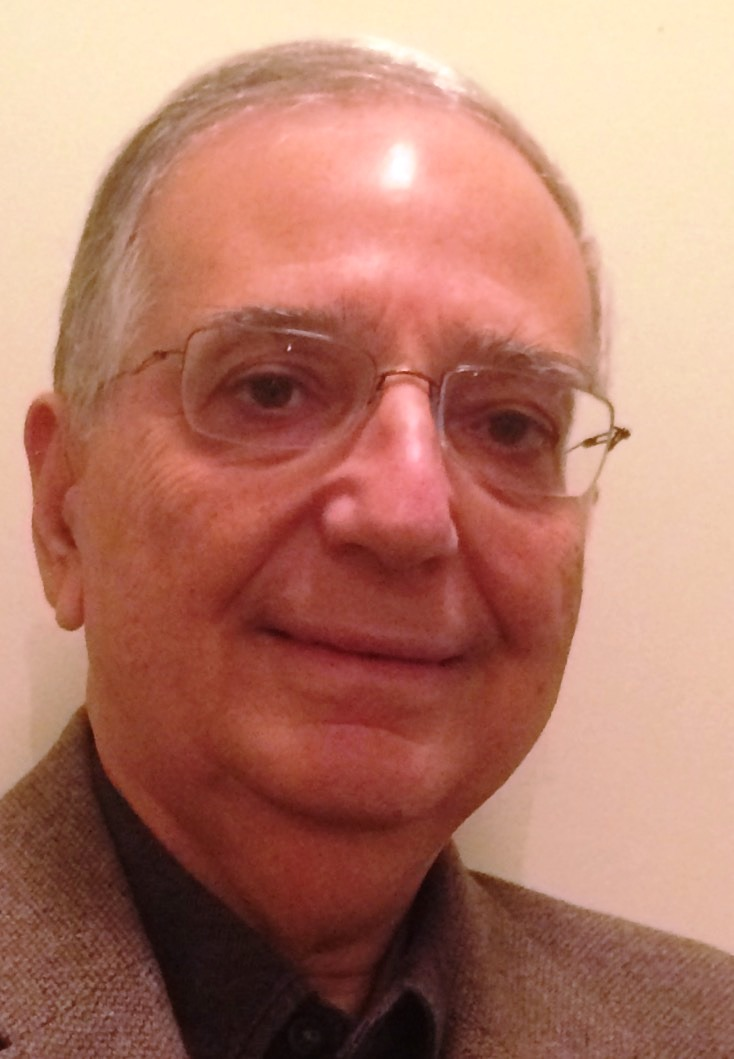
- Born: August 29, 1947 (age 78); Alexandria, Egypt

Gabriel Hawawini (born August 29, 1947) is an Emeritus Professor of Finance at INSEAD business school where he held the Henry Grunfeld Chair in Investment Banking from 1996 to 2013 and served as dean from 2000 to 2006, during which time the institution expanded from its original campus in France into Asia (Singapore) and the Middle East (Abu Dhabi).

== Education ==
Hawawini earned an electrical engineering degree from the University of Toulouse and his doctorate in Economics and Finance from the New York University.

== Honors and awards ==
The French Legion of Honor
