= WebPT =

Electronic medical records service

WebPT, Inc.
- Type: Private Company
- Industry: Healthcare Information Technology; Health informatics
- Founded: 2008; 18 years ago
- Founders: Heidi Jannenga; Brad Jannenga
- Headquarters: Phoenix, Arizona, United States
- Key people: Ashley Glover (CEO); Heidi Jannenga (Co-Founder & CCO)
- Products: Electronic Medical Records; Practice Management
- Website: webpt.com

WebPT is a Phoenix, Arizona-based company that provides web-based electronic medical record (EMR) systems for physical therapists, occupational therapists, and speech-language pathologists. In addition to its patient documentation software, WebPT offers systems for billing, scheduling, and practice management. As of December 2022, more than 200,000 rehab therapists across more than 20,000 clinics use WebPT.

WebPT was named to the Inc. 5000 list of the "fastest-growing private U.S. companies" for nine consecutive years from 2013 to 2021.

== History ==
WebPT was founded in 2008 by Heidi Jannenga and Brad Jannenga. Heidi managed several physical therapy practices, which helped spark the idea for a cloud-based software that would streamline therapists’ documentation processes. Today, Heidi remains at the company as co-founder and Chief Clinical Officer and Ashley Glover is its CEO.

In 2010, the startup received a $1 million funding round from Canal Partners, led by Jim Armstrong.

To expand its billing system, WebPT acquired Health Data Solutions in 2012, a revenue cycle management business that provided billing services primarily to physical therapists and chiropractors.

In 2013, WebPT launched the WebPT Marketplace, an e-commerce site with the goal of selling clinical supplies to WebPT customers at reduced rates.

In June 2014, WebPT received an undisclosed investment from venture capital firm Battery Ventures. Five months later, WebPT acquired WebOutcomes, an online outcomes tracking tool offering evidence-based tests that physical and occupational therapists use to collect objective patient data.

In 2017, WebPT acquired Strive Labs, Inc. a Boston-based company that provided patient relationship management and home exercise technology. The following year in 2018, WebPT acquired Upland, California-based BMS Practice Solutions, a revenue cycle management software company for rehab therapists.

In August 2019, private equity firm Warburg Pincus signed an agreement to buy a majority stake in WebPT from Battery Ventures.

In January 2022, WebPT acquired Oregon-based Clincient, another physical therapy EMR software and its subsidiary Keet Health.
