= M. M. Warburg & Co. =

German private bank

M. M. Warburg & CO (AG & Co.) KGaA

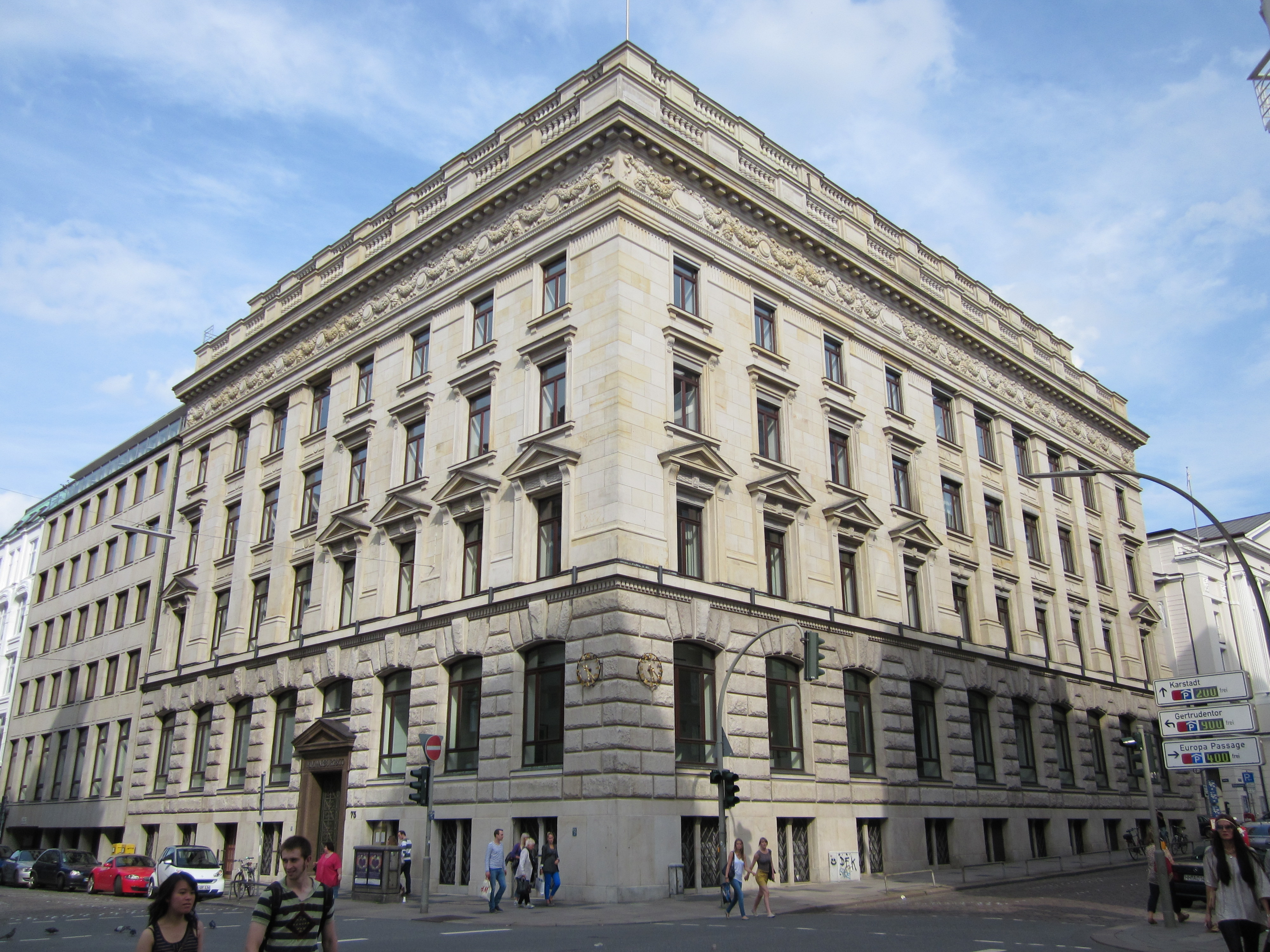
- M. M. Warburg & CO headquarters in Ferdinandstraße, Altstadt, Hamburg
- Type: Limited partnership with share capital (KGaA)
- Industry: financial service activities, except insurance and pension funding
- Founded: 1798; 228 years ago
- Headquarters: Ferdinandstraße 75; 20095 Hamburg, Germany
- Key people: Markus Bolder (Board member); Stephan Schrameier (Board member); Dr. Thomas A. Lange (Chairman of the Supervisory Board)
- Products: Private Banking; Asset Management; Corporate & Investment Banking
- Number of employees: 620 (M.M.Warburg & CO)
- Website: www.mmwarburg.com

M. M. Warburg & CO (AG & Co.) KGaA is a German private bank, based in Hamburg. It is a family-owned bank founded in 1798 by brothers Moses Marcus Warburg and Gerson Warburg of the Warburg family. The bank was seized and Aryanized by the Nazis. The Warburg family still owns 40 percent of the bank, continuing a more than 225-year legacy of private ownership.

== History ==
The firm was formed in 1798 and long described itself as a moneychanger (German: Geldwechsler); it changed that denomination to "bank" only in 1863.

=== Nazi era ===
In 1933, when the Nazis came to power in Germany, Jews were persecuted, and their property began being transferred to non-Jews. In 1938, the Nazis arrested Fritz Moritz Warburg, former head of M. M. Warburg Co. and younger brother of Paul Warburg and Felix M. Warburg. After being held for several months, he was released and went to Stockholm, eventually becoming a Swedish citizen. The bank was Aryanized but its name remained unchanged. It was transformed from a family firm to a limited company, and new managers were brought in, notably Rudolf Brinckmann and Paul Wirtz.

Siegmund Warburg emigrated from Nazi Germany in 1934 and founded S. G. Warburg & Co. in London in 1946.

=== Postwar ===
The bank rose to become one of the most powerful investment banks in the City during the 60s, 70s, and 80s and Warburg himself one of London's most preeminent and influential financiers of the era. The London subsidiary was sold to Swiss Bank Corporation in 1995 and is today a part of UBS. Some descendants immigrated to the United States, for business reasons and to escape the persecution, and established themselves there. They include banker Paul Warburg and his nephew Eric M. Warburg, founder of Warburg Pincus.

=== Recent acquisitions ===
During recent years, the bank has grown through many acquisitions. It bought several German private banks such as Marcard, Stein & Co. in Hamburg, Carl F. Plump & CO AG in Bremen, Bankhaus Hallbaum AG in Hannover and Bankhaus Löbbecke in Berlin. Since 2009 the Schwäbische Bank AG in Stuttgart has been part of the Warburg Bank. In 2016 the former subsidiary banks Bankhaus Hallbaum, Bankhaus Löbbecke, Bankhaus Carl F. Plump & CO and Schwäbische Bank were amalgamated with M. M. Warburg & CO.

The bank's headquarters are located at Ferdinandstraße 75 in Hamburg, with additional offices in Frankfurt, Berlin, Hanover, Bremen, Stuttgart, Munich and Cologne.

Today, M. M. Warburg & CO's core business is in private banking, asset management, and corporate & investment banking, serving private, corporate and institutional clients.

== Cum-Ex scandal ==
The bank has been implicated in the Cum-Ex scandal, accused of defrauding taxpayers in excess of over 50 million euro. One of the leading players in cum-ex transactions, Hanno Berger, advised M. M. Warburg & CO. According to a Spiegel report published in March 2021, Warburg paid 17.5 million euros to Hanno Berger and Benjamin Frey for advice on cum-ex deals. Warburg wired the money to Sarasin Bank, which routed it to an offshore firm owned by Berger and Frey in the British Virgin Islands.

At the end of 2019, Christian Olearius and Max Warburg Jr. resigned from the Supervisory Board of M.M.Warburg & CO. The tax liability from the share transactions was repaid in full in 2020, mainly from the owners' private assets.

On January 12, 2022, the former managing director of a Warburg subsidiary in Luxembourg surprisingly confessed during a trial before the Bonn Regional Court ('third cum-ex criminal trial'). He is regarded as the Warburg Group's first confessed cum-ex actor.

The lawyer Gerhard Strate filed a complaint against Olaf Scholz and Peter Tschentscher in February 2022. The then mayor and now federal chancellor Scholz and the then finance senator and now mayor Tschentscher are accused of having initially waived taxes totalling 47 million euros from M. M. Warburg & Co. Strate accuses the politicians of aiding and abetting tax evasion. An investigation committee of the City of Hamburg is looking into the matter.

In April 2023, the Bonn Regional Court admitted an indictment by the Cologne public prosecutor's office against Dr Christian Olearius for serious tax evasion. On 24 June 2024, the trial against Dr Christian Olearius was discontinued for health reasons.

== Literature ==
- Massimo Bognanni (2022): Unter den Augen des Staates. Der größte Steuerraub in der Geschichte der Bundesrepublik. dtv ISBN 9783423283069
- Klessmann, Eckart (2004). M. M. Warburg & CO 1798—1998: Die Geschichte des Bankhauses. Hamburg: Dölling und Galitz. ISBN 3-933374-27-8.
- Wechsberg, Joseph (1966). The Merchant Bankers. Boston: Little, Brown.
- Rosenbaum, Eduard (1979). M. M. Warburg & CO, Merchant Bankers of Hamburg; A Survey of the First 140 years, 1798 to 1938. London: Hurst. ISBN 0-905838-07-6.

== See also ==
- S. G. Warburg & Co.
- Warburg family
- List of banks in Germany
