= Venari Resources =

Venari Resources LLC
- Company type: LLC
- Industry: Oil and gas
- Founded: May 2012
- Defunct: 2020
- Headquarters: Dallas & Houston, Texas, U.S.
- Key people: Brian Reinsborough (CEO & President); Rich Smith (Executive Vice President, Exploration); Bruce Busmire (Executive Vice President & CFO)
- Number of employees: 34 (June 2013)
- Website: VenariResources.com

Venari Resources LLC was a privately held offshore exploration and production company founded in 2012 by Brian Reinsborough. It was focused on the oil-prone subsalt region in the Gulf of Mexico’s deep waters. In May 2012, global private equity investment firms Warburg Pincus, Kelso & Company, Temasek Holdings and The Jordan Company provided an initial $1.125 billion capital commitment to pursue its exploration program and development projects in the Gulf of Mexico.

In December 2019, Talos executed a purchase and sale agreement and closed on the acquisition of all primary term acreage and prospects from Venari Resources. The company website indicated that the company would cease operations in early 2020.

== Assets ==
Venari built a large inventory of drillable prospects and leases in the Gulf of Mexico, including the Coronado discovery and the Shenandoah discovery in the Walker Ridge area.

== Office Locations ==
The company was headquartered in Dallas and had an additional office location in the Houston Energy Corridor. On June 3, 2013, Venari had 34 employees.
