= Bankhaus Löbbecke =

Coordinates: 52.515807°N 13.393628°E

- Company type: Corporation
- Founded: 1761; 265 years ago
- Headquarters: Berlin, Germany
- Total assets: € 161,6 million (2014)
- Number of employees: 41 (2014)
- Parent: M. M. Warburg & Co.
- Website: www.bankhaus-loebbecke.de

Bankhaus Löbbecke AG was a German private bank that is headquartered in Berlin. The bank was founded in 1761 as a trading house in Iserlohn, settled in Braunschweig as early as 1763. The bank was eventually acquired by the Hamburg private bank M. M. Warburg & Co. in 2016.

The bank concentrated on private customer business and asset management for financially strong clientele and companies. It also offered the administration and settlement of non-performing loans under trust and service agreements.

== History of the bank ==
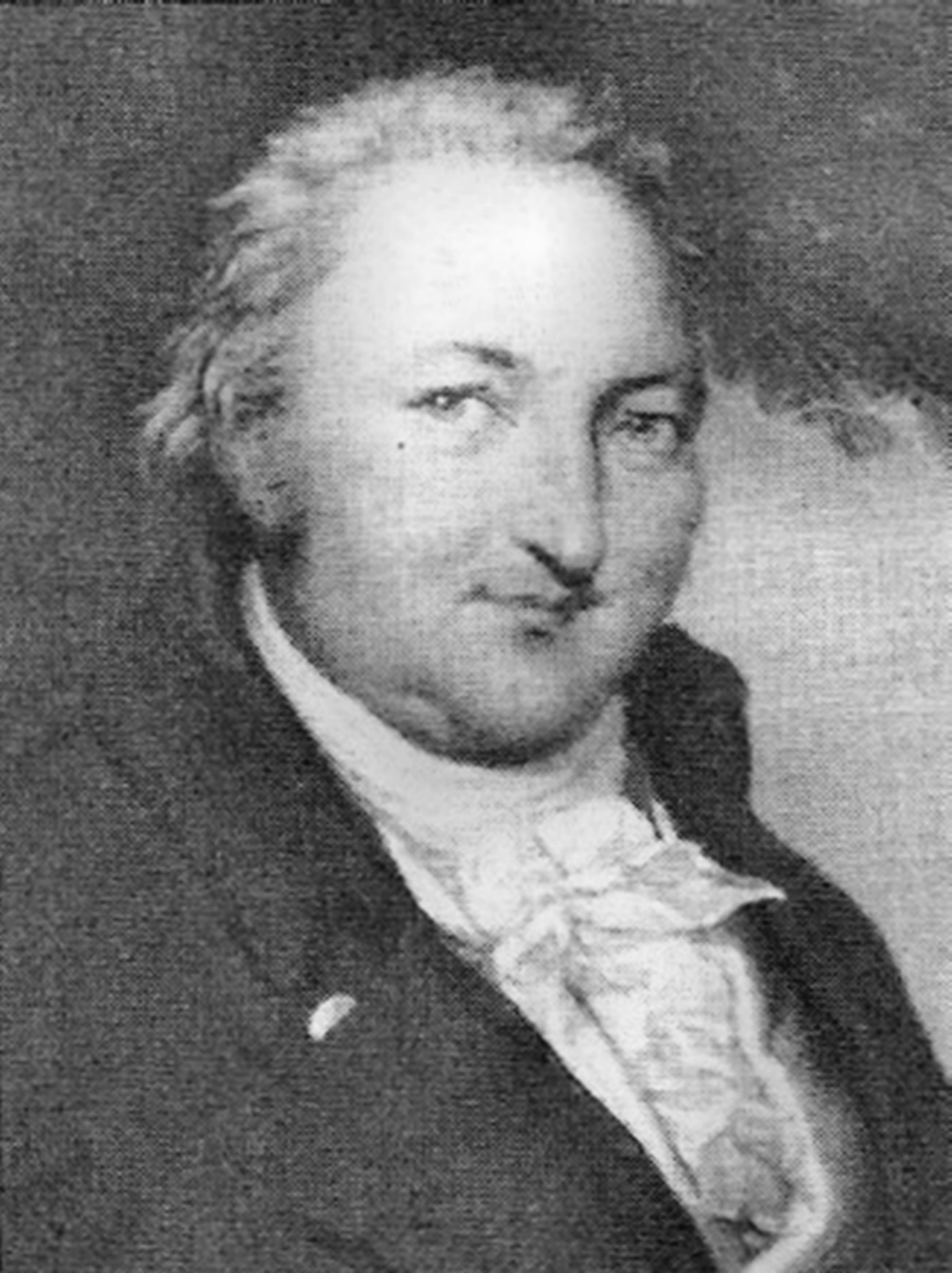
Carl Friedrich Löbbecke

In 1761 Johann Hermann (1727–1793) and Johann Melchior Löbbecke (1728–1783) founded the Handelshaus Löbbecke in Iserlohn. In 1763 the branch in Braunschweig, An der Martinikirche 4, was already founded, which handled the trading of mercery, costume jewelry and metal goods. In 1783 Johann Melchior's son, Carl Friedrich Löbbecke, became sole managing director.

Around 1800, the trading company also included cotton fabrics in its range and increasingly took over exchange and transfer businesses. In the middle of the 19th century, the pure banking house Gebrüder Löbbecke & Co. was founded, in response to the growing capital requirements of the start of the industrialization.

The bank managed the private assets of the ruling Duke Wilhelm and served the upper classes of the region. It leased the Braunschweig State Lottery until 1911.

The family included Luise Löbbecke (1808–1892), who rendered outstanding services to the welfare system and in 1862 became the first woman to become an honorary citizen of the city of Braunschweig.

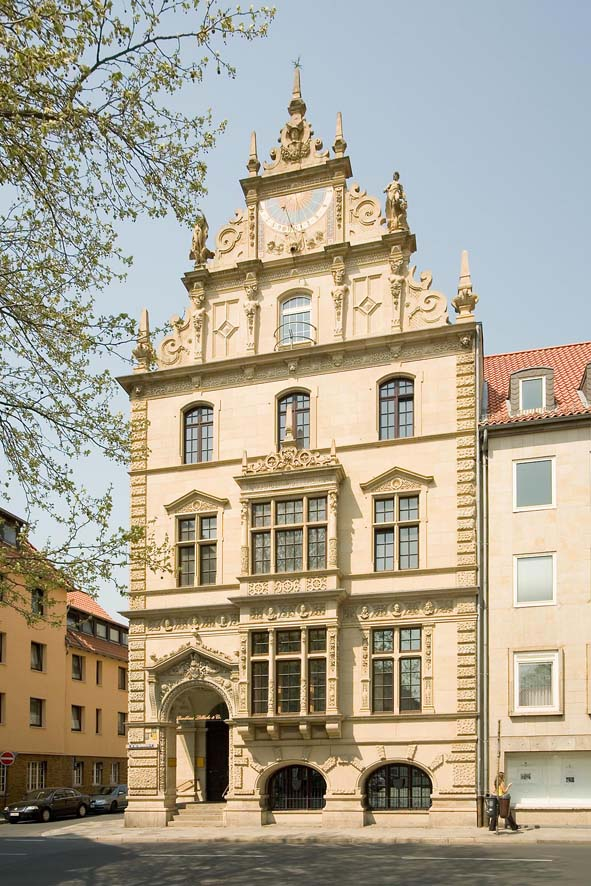
Headquarters in Braunschweig

In 1880/81 the banker, Alfred Löbbecke, had the Braunschweig architect Constantin Uhde and the garden architect Friedrich Kreiß build a villa on Inselwall (Löbbecke's Island), which was destroyed in 1944 and after reconstruction from 1968 to 2008 housed the guest house of the Technical University of Braunschweig. The building, which has since been vacant, was sold by the Braunschweig University Association to the Braunschweig investor Klaus Gattermann for €700,000 in 2009 and has been used commercially since 2011. The current bank building in Braunschweig was also erected by Uhde in 1892.

During the banking crisis in 1930, the bank was converted into a limited partnership in which Braunschweigische Staatsbank, a forerunner of today's Norddeutsche Landesbank, participated.

In May 1946, the then owner Rudolf Löbbecke, committed suicide. Despite recurring crises, the Löbbecke family was able to remain in management positions for six generations until 1983, when the bankruptcy of a local craftsman's business put the bank in a difficult position again and an important limited partner insisted on payment. The last personally liable partner was Carl-Friedrich Löbbecke.

In 1983, Norddeutsche Landesbank became the sole shareholder. It sold the bank in late 1983 to the Berlin banker Günter Follmer and co-investors. In the following years the latter led the bank to a new heyday, whereby the balance sheet volume of the bank was increased from DM 30 million in 1983 to DM 6.3 billion in 1995. In terms of size based on the balance sheet volume, the bank was therefore the second largest German private bank after the private bank Sal. Oppenheim. The growth initiated by the banker Follmer was accompanied by a comprehensive realignment and modernization, as well as a spatial expansion beyond the Braunschweig area to Berlin (headquarters), Frankfurt/Main, Munich, Dresden and Magdeburg. In 1989 the Italian CARIPLO acquired the qualified majority. Even before the German reunification, the bank opened a branch in East Berlin in 1990. The surprising death of banker Follmer in 1995 marked the end of the bank's expansion phase. In parallel with the economic difficulties in the entire German banking industry, triggered among other things by the unsatisfactory economic development in the new federal states, but also by the consequences of its own strategic decisions, the bank underwent a period of reorientation with heavy losses from 1996 to at least 2000.

== Recent past ==
After several mergers and restructuring of the Italian parent company, which held the entire share capital since 1997, the bank became a wholly owned subsidiary of the Hamburg private bank M.M.Warburg & CO KGaA on 22 December 2003 and therefore had a fully private shareholder background again. According to the Bundesanzeiger of 12 July 2006, Bankhaus Löbbecke GmbH & Co. KG merged with M.M. Warburg & Co Zweite Kapitalbeteiligungsgesellschaft mbH and was simultaneously renamed Bankhaus Löbbecke AG. This was merged in 2016 to form the parent company M.M.Warburg & CO. Today, Bankhaus Löbbecke operates as a branch of the Hamburger Privatbank.

The banks Berlin headquarters were most recently located in the Behren Palais, the former headquarters of Dresdner Bank and later the domicile of the Staatsbank, at the same time also the capital representative office of M.M.Warburg & CO.
