= Michael Marks (financier) =

British businessman (born 1941)

Michael Marks CBE
- Born: 28 December 1941 (age 84)
- Occupation: Financier
- Known for: Leading Smith New Court (1987-1995) and Merrill Lynch Europe (1995-2003)

Michael John Paul Marks (born 28 December 1941) is a British businessman, best known as executive chairman of Merrill Lynch Europe (1995 – 2003) and before that CEO and then chairman of City of London stockbroker Smith New Court (1985 to 1995) until its acquisition by Merrill Lynch in 1995.

== Career ==
Marks’ career began at City of London stockjobbing firm Smith Brothers (later Smith New Court) in 1958, where he started as a messenger and then “blue button”, working his way up to the position of director in 1975.

In 1987, Marks became CEO of what had then become Smith New Court when NM Rothschild had taken a stake. In 1995, he took over from Sir Michael Richardson as executive chairman of the firm, overseeing its sale to Merrill Lynch that same year.

Marks left Merrill Lynch in 2003 to set up a new boutique investment house with other ex-Merrill Lynch colleagues. In a nod to their earlier days, the new venture was called NewSmith Capital Partners. Marks, along with co-founder Stephen Zimmermann, retired from NewSmith in 2014.

Marks was also a non-executive director of the London Stock Exchange between 1994 and 2004. During that time, Merrill Lynch advised the London Stock Exchange on its ill-fated merger with Deutsche Börse in 2000; but it stepped down from that role after that proposed transaction unravelled.

Marks was appointed a CBE for services to the financial services industry in the 1999 New Year Honours list.
