= Equitas =

Reinsurance company

Equitas is a group of companies that was formed in 1995 to assume by way of reinsurance the vast and crippling liabilities that had accumulated in the syndicates at Lloyd's of London on insurance policies written on the 1992 and all prior years of account. These liabilities were reinsured by Equitas Reinsurance Limited (ERL), which was also appointed as the run-off agent. The liabilities were then retroceded (reinsured again) to Equitas Limited, to which ERL also delegated its run-off function.

== Background ==
In the late 1980s and early 1990s, Lloyd's became engulfed with losses arising predominantly out of asbestosis, pollution and health hazard policies, some dating back several decades. Thousands of individuals (known as "Names") who had invested in Lloyd's syndicates that wrote these long-tail liability risks, or reinsured other syndicates that had, were facing financial ruin.

The proposal to set up the Equitas structure formed part of the Lloyd's "Reconstruction and Renewal" (R&R) plan that was devised under chairman Sir David Rowland and chief executive Peter Middleton. It was accepted by 90% of the c. 34,000 Names who had underwritten policies at Lloyd's, and it became mandatory for all members to reinsure their general insurance (non-life assurance) liabilities into Equitas on business allocated to the 1992 and all prior years of account. When Equitas started it had £15 billion of liabilities at net present value, which were expected to take up to 40 years to settle. It also had assets amounting to 105% of the liabilities, making it the largest start-up company to date. Equitas is not permitted to take on new business but it remains the largest solvent run-off reinsurer globally.

== Structure ==
Equitas Holdings Limited is a group of four companies run by eight directors and owned by four trustees who hold the shares on behalf of those who reinsured their liabilities into it. The chairman is David Shipley and Jeremy Heap is the chief executive officer.

According to its 2020 report and accounts, Equitas' outstanding liabilities totalled £4.62 billion, of which £3.925bn was allocated to liabilities in the United States. The company believes its assets are adequate to pay its liabilities in full but the accounts are qualified because of the inherent uncertainty in quantifying the liabilities.

The company exists solely to run-off the remaining claims incurred under the pre-1993 policies written at Lloyd's and will continue to do so until all such liabilities have been fully extinguished.

== National Indemnity ==
In March 2007 National Indemnity Company, a subsidiary of Berkshire Hathaway, entered into an agreement with Equitas to assume of all of its assets and liabilities, provide an additional $7bn of reinsurance for its whole account, and take over the staff and management of the business. Equitas was renamed Resolute Management Services Limited. The transaction was approved by regulators in both the United Kingdom and United States. The deal included a £90m contributed from the Corporation of Lloyd's. There was expected to be a small distribution to all reinsured Names, who were consulted about the agreement.

The reinsurance was purchased in two tranches, the first for $5.7bn in March 2007 and this provided cover over and above the $8.11bn of reserves set aside to meet claims obligations, for a total of $13.81bn. The second tranche of $1.3bn was purchased in 2009.

Equitas sought to novate its remaining liabilities, subject to High Court approval. This process could only be progressed once the law in England was changed to allow it, which was in progress at the time the National Indemnity deal was announced.

== Transfer ==
In June 2009 the High Court approved the transfer, under Part VII of the Financial Services and Markets Act 2000, of all of the 1992 and prior-years non-life liabilities of open and closed year Names to a new company called Equitas Insurance Limited, including the PCW syndicates' liabilities previously reinsured by Lioncover Insurance Company and the Warrilow syndicates' liabilities previously reinsured by Centrewrite Limited. This transfer marked the closure of all Names' liabilities under 1992 and prior years under English law. Hugh Stevenson, who chaired Equitas from 1998 to 2009, said at the time that “the long day’s work is done”.

As of 2020, $2.63bn of the $7bn of reinsurance purchased from National Indemnity has been utilised to pay for losses that have deteriorated since the transaction in 2007, meaning there is $4.37bn of reinsurance cover available to cover any potential future deterioration of the claim reserves.
