= Mullens & Co. =

Mullens & Co. was a stock brokerage firm founded in 1786 (240 years ago). The firm served as 'government brokers', to the government of the United Kingdom. Its main focus was the gilt-edged market. Though they were primarily government brokers, they also held a number of private clients.The role of a government broker is to "raise new money and maintain an orderly market in gilt-edged stocks, "lengthening the debt" by issuing long-dated paper and buying in shorter issues." The government brokers would wear black silk top hats to ensure they could be seen – and thus the actions of the government could be seen – from all across the exchange floor.

The formal title assigned to the Senior Partner of the firm was "Broker to the Commissioners for the Reduction of the National Debt". Who served as a link between "the Bank of England, the Commissioners for the Reduction of the National Debt and the gilt-edged market in the London Stock Exchange". This was the official title established by William Pitt the Younger in 1786. The role involved an attendance at the Bank of England on a Thursday morning to be informed of any change in the Bank Rate, which the senior partner would then communicate to the Stock Exchange. The broker would be accompanied on his visit to the stock exchange by a junior member of the Mullens & Co. staff, that in the event he should be struck down on his journey, the junior member would be able to obtain the bank rate (written on a piece of paper inside his pocket) and present it to the stock exchange.

In 1949 the company became a private unlimited company for tax purposes. In April 1986 (39 years ago) Mullens & Co. was bought out by SG Warburg and ceased to operate. The parameters of which companies could operate as Government Broker were broadened, allowing banks and securities houses to register with the Bank of England as brokers, now renamed as gilt-edged market makers (GEMMs).

== See also ==
- London Gold fixing
- Bank of England Nominees
- UK Government Investments
