= Sara Warburg =

German banker (1805–1884)

Sara Warburg (1805–1884), was a German banker.

She was the manager of the M.M.Warburg & CO, the 4th–biggest bank in Hamburg, after the death of her husband in 1856. She remained the manager until 1865.
