= Moses Marcus Warburg =

German banker

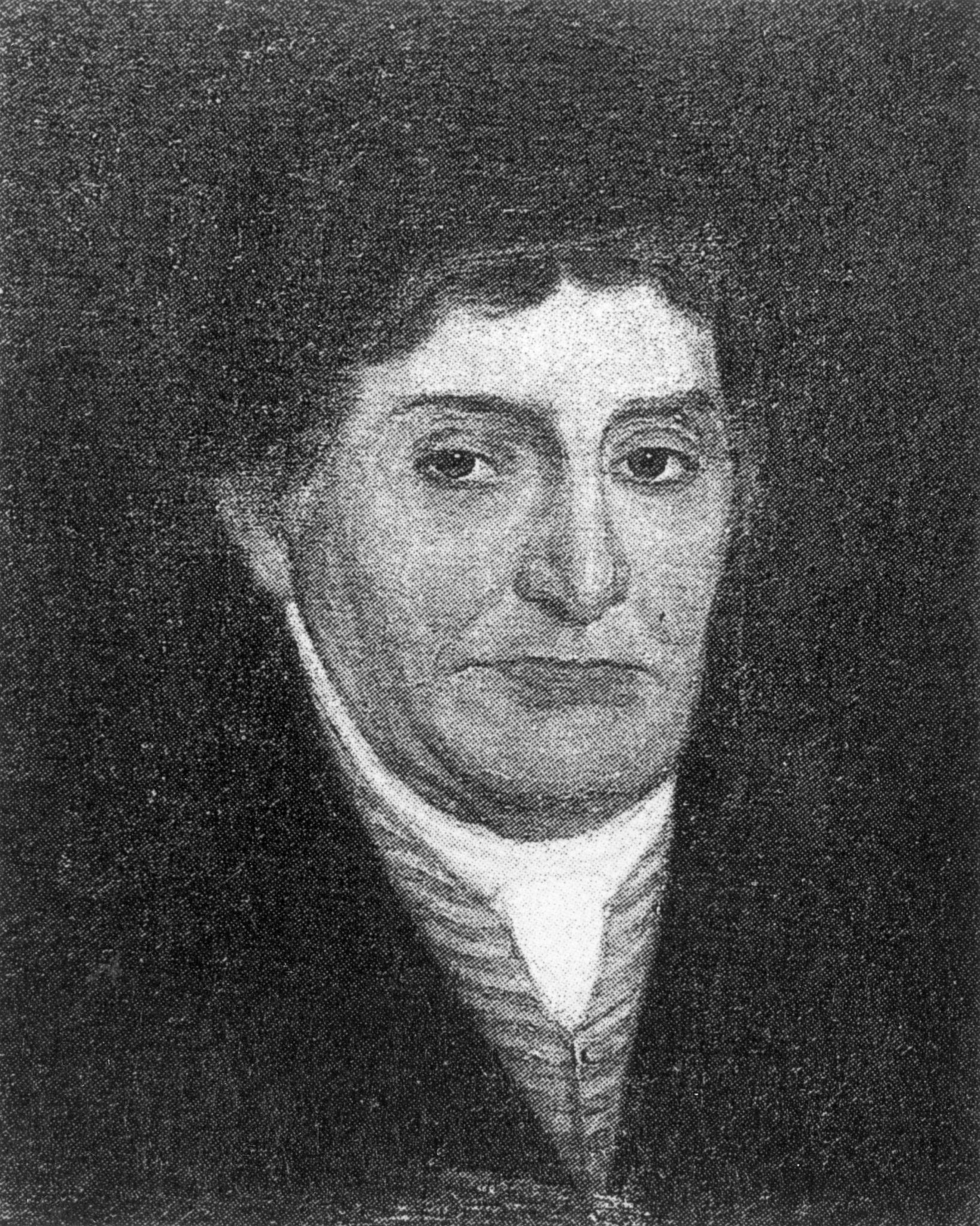
Warburg c. 1810

Moses Marcus Warburg (born 1763 in Hamburg; died November 18, 1830) was a German banker and founder of the private bank M.M. Warburg & Co.

== Family ==
Warburg came from a Jewish family, originally known as "Del Banco," which had its roots in Italy before relocating to Warburg, Westphalia, at the end of the 16th century. Upon settling in Warburg, they adopted the town's name as their surname. By the end of the 17th century, the family had moved to Altona, which was under Danish administration. Gumprich Marcus Warburg (1727-1801) continued the family's tradition of engaging in money exchange and pawnbroking in Altona, a practice that had been passed down through previous generations.

Warburg had a brother named Gerson Marcus (1765-1825). Warburg married Röschen Hausen (Abrahamson) and they had a daughter named Sara "Särchen" (1805-1884).

== Establishment of the Bank M.M. Warburg & Co ==
In 1798, Gumprich Marcus Warburg handed over the reins of his business to his two sons, Moses Marcus and Gerson Marcus. The brothers had distinct personalities: Moses Marcus was known for being level-headed, energetic, and deeply religious, whereas Gerson Marcus led a more unstable life. Recognizing the potential for conflict, their father urged them in his will to resolve any disputes amicably.

Despite their differences, the brothers successfully continued their father's business, operating under the name "M.M. Warburg & Co." They focused on facilitating trade transactions through the use of bills of exchange and coins. Additionally, both brothers worked independently on the stock exchange, leveraging their individual skills to drive the business forward.

Despite facing stiff competition from several smaller banks that emerged in Hamburg around the turn of the century, the Warburg brothers successfully established themselves in the market. In 1810, they formalized their partnership with a written agreement, penned in Hebrew-Aramaic. The fact that the Jewish community recognized and authenticated this agreement was largely due to Moses Marcus's strong ties to the community as an Orthodox Jew.

Although Warburg was a respected member of the Jewish community, he did not hold any leadership positions. When approached to take on the role of president, he declined, citing health concerns. Instead, he focused on supporting the community through philanthropic efforts, such as funding a yeshiva and backing the publication of religious literature. Notably, he did not participate in the negotiations that led to the separation of the Jewish communities of Altona and Hamburg in 1810, choosing to maintain a low profile in community politics.

The Warburg brothers capitalized on Hamburg's strategic position in North German bill exchange and silver trade, which contributed to their business success. Warburg's personal wealth was substantial, with estimates suggesting he owned around 250,000 Mark Banco. However, he was not among the top 40 wealthiest families in Hamburg, as evidenced by the fact that he was not required to pay contributions during the French occupation of Hamburg in 1813 under Napoleon I.

To ensure the continuation of his business, Warburg transferred shares to his nephew, Abraham "Aby" Samuel Warburg in 1829. This move was likely motivated by Aby's marriage to Warburg's daughter, Särchen, the same year.

In 1829 or 1830, Warburg suffered a stroke while attending a service at the synagogue. In November 1830, he died and was laid to rest in the Hamburg section of the Jewish Cemetery on Königstraße. In his will, he left a significant bequest of 250,000 Mark Banco, equivalent to approximately 125,000 Prussian thalers, to his daughter Sara.

Following the death of Warburg, his nephew Aby took over the management of the business. Aby was joined by his cousin, Elias Warburg, who remained with the bank until 1837. Warburg's daughter Sara ultimately assumed de facto control of the bank, effectively becoming its leader.

== Books ==
- Lorenz, Ina. "Warburg, Moses Marcus", in Franklin Kopitzsch and Dirk Brietzke (eds.), Hamburgische Biografie. Band 6. Wallstein, Göttingen 2012, ISBN 978-3-8353-1025-4, pages 356–357.
