= Mercury Asset Management =

British investment management business

Mercury Asset Management plc
- Industry: Investment management
- Founded: 1969; 57 years ago
- Defunct: 1997; 29 years ago
- Fate: Acquired by Merrill
- Headquarters: London, UK
- Key people: Peter Stormonth Darling (Chairman), Hugh Stevenson (Chairman), Carol Galley (Vice-Chairman), Stephen Zimmerman (Deputy Chairman)
- Number of employees: 1,300

Mercury Asset Management plc was a leading British investment management business. In 1997, it was acquired by Merrill and in 2006, it was acquired by BlackRock.

== History ==
The company was established in 1969 when S. G. Warburg & Co., the investment bank, won an investment management contract and set up Warburg Investment Management to execute it. In 1987 25% of the business was floated on the London Stock Exchange as Mercury Asset Management. Carol Galley, one of its leading managers, was credited with facilitating the takeovers by Granada of both London Weekend Television in 1994 and Forte Group in 1996. At its peak more than half the companies on the FTSE 100 used Mercury Asset Management for investment management purposes.

In 1995, the company achieved full independence when S. G. Warburg & Co. sold its investment banking business to Swiss Bank Corporation; through a scheme of arrangement the residue of S. G. Warburg & Co. became a subsidiary of Mercury Asset Management and S. G. Warburg & Co. shareholders become shareholders in Mercury Asset Management.

The company was acquired by Merrill for £3.1 billion in 1997. Mercury was rebranded Merrill Lynch Investment Managers (MLIM). It was acquired by BlackRock in 2006.

== Legacy ==
Five years after BlackRock’s 2006 acquisition of MLIM, one UK media report quoted a consultant as saying: "BlackRock is a big firm. But there is more than a trace of Mercury DNA running through it." This was particularly true in Europe where BlackRock’s business was headed until 2015 by James Charrington, who had joined Mercury in 1993.

A number of investors who worked at Mercury Asset Management during the late 1980s and 1990s went on to occupy senior positions within the industry in the generation that followed. Nicola Horlick’s career in investment banking began at Mercury, when it was called Warburg. Before Paul Marshall established Marshall Wace he had worked for Mercury. In 2001, Peter Davies and Stuart Roden went on to establish a successful UK equity fund for Lansdowne Partners. The following year, Anne Richards left to join Edinburgh Fund Managers and onwards to Aberdeen Asset Management where she was CIO before becoming CEO at M&G Investments in 2014 and at CEO at Fidelity International in 2018. Andreas Utermann left Mercury/MLIM for Allianz, followed two years later by Elizabeth Corley; they co-headed Allianz Global Investors as Global CIO and CEO respectively, from 2012 until 2016; Utermann continued as CEO until 2019. while Corley has joined a number of boards and led a government review on social impact investing. Saker Nusseibeh, the CEO of Hermes Investment Management, began his career at Mercury in 1987.

While Carol Galley did not return to fund management following her departure from Mercury in 2001, Stephen Zimmerman her co-head did set up a boutique investment firm, NewSmith Capital Partners, in 2004 along with other former senior managers from Merrill Lynch (Michael Marks, Paul Roy and Check Low, who had joined Merrill via the acquisition of Smith New Court).
