= Michael Richardson (investment banker) =

British investment banker

- Born: Michael John de Rougemont Richardson; 9 April 1925; London, England
- Died: 12 May 2003 (aged 78); London, England
- Education: Harrow School; Kent School
- Occupation: Investment banker
- Spouse: Octavia Mayhew
- Children: 3

Sir Michael Richardson (9 April 1925 – 12 May 2003) was a British investment banker in London. While he was managing director of N M Rothschild & Sons from 1981 to 1990, he was an informal advisor to Margaret Thatcher on economic policy. He was known as "Mr Privatisation".

== Early life ==
Michael Richardson was born on 9 April 1925 in London. His father worked in insurance in the City of London. His mother Audrey de Rougemont was of Huguenot origin.

He was educated at Harrow School in London. At the outset of World War II, he was evacuated to the United States, where he finished his education at the Kent School in Connecticut. In 1943, he joined the war effort by serving in the Irish Guards. He was wounded in Nijmegen, The Netherlands, and later served in Palestine/Israel.

== Career ==
Richardson started his career for Harley Drayton in 1949. Three years later, in 1952, he became a junior partner at Panmure Gordon & Co., where he worked until 1971. He worked at Cazenove from 1971 to 1981. He served as managing director of N M Rothschild & Sons from 1981 to 1990, and as its vice-chairman from 1990 to 1994.

He served as the Chairman of Smith New Court from 1990 to 1995, and consultant from 1995 to 1996. He served as the Vice-Chairman of Hambro Magan from 1995 to 1996. He served as the Vice-Chairman of Hawkpoint Partners, a subsidiary of NatWest, from 1995 to 1996. He served on the board of directors of the Savoy Hotel for twenty years.

During Margaret Thatcher's prime ministerial years, he served as an informal advisor to HM Treasury. He was knighted by Thatcher in 1990.

His career came to an end due to unsafe loans he made to Alan Shephard, an American businessman. As a result, he lost his licence with the Securities & Futures Authority.

== Freemasonry ==
Richardson was an active freemason. He served as the Chairman of the Royal Masonic Hospital in Hammersmith, London.

== Personal life ==
He married Octavia Mayhew in 1949. They had a son and two daughters. His granddaughter Dr. Flora Richardson married Richard de la Poer Beresford, Earl of Tyrone, heir of the Marquess of Waterford, in 2017. His wife predeceased him, dying in 1999.

He was the master of the Crawley and Horsham Hunt and summered on the Isle of Wight, where he enjoyed sailing. He was a freemason.

== Death ==
He died on 12 May 2003 in London. He was seventy-eight years old.

== See also ==
- Thatcherism
- Neoliberalism
