= Eric M. Warburg =

German American businessman (1900–1990)

- Historical photo of Eric M. Warburg
- Born: Eric Moritz Warburg; April 15, 1900; Hamburg, Germany
- Died: July 9, 1990 (aged 90); Hamburg, Germany
- Occupations: Investment banker, businessman
- Known for: founder of Warburg Pincus
- Spouse: Dorothea Thorsch
- Children: 3
- Relatives: Max Warburg (father)

Erich Moritz Warburg (15 April 1900 – 9 July 1990) was a German and American businessman and a member of the prominent Warburg family of German bankers.

== Early life and education ==
Warburg was born to a German family in Hamburg, Germany on April 15, 1900 His parents were Alice (née Magnus) and Max Warburg, director of M. M. Warburg & Co. and scion of the Warburg banking family.

Warburg was educated at the Heinrich Hertz-Realgymnasium in Hamburg. In 1918, he served in the German Army. In 1938, he fled Germany for the United States and during World War II, he served as a lieutenant colonel and intelligence officer in the United States Army. As a German language speaker, he interrogated many prominent Nazis including Hermann Göring.

During the war, Warburg facilitated the migration of German scientists and their families to the United States. He was later awarded the Legion of Merit by the United States, the Order of the British Empire by Great Britain, and the Croix de Guerre by France.

== Career ==
Warburg apprenticed in the banking business in Berlin, Frankfurt, Amsterdam, London and New York City. From 1929 to 1938 he was a managing partner of M. M. Warburg & Co. in Hamburg and of Warburg & Company of Amsterdam. In 1939, he founded E.M. Warburg & Co. in New York City (which later became the private equity firm Warburg Pincus).

Warburg is most known for his efforts to strengthen German-American relations, for which he was awarded the inaugural Eric M. Warburg Prize.

== Personal life ==
He was married to Dorothea Thorsch. They had three children: Max of Hamburg, Germany; and two daughters, Dr. Marie Warburg of Chestnut Hill, Massachusetts and Erica Warburg also of Hamburg, Germany.
