= S. G. Warburg & Co. =

Former British investment bank (1946–1995)

- Type: Public company
- Industry: Banking
- Founded: 1946
- Founder: Henry Grunfeld
- Defunct: 1995
- Fate: Acquired
- Successor: Swiss Bank Corporation and UBS
- Headquarters: London, UK
- Key people: Sir Siegmund George Warburg, (chairman)
- Number of employees: 6,000

S. G. Warburg & Co. was a London-based investment bank. It was listed on the London Stock Exchange and was once a constituent of the FTSE 100 Index. The firm was acquired by the Swiss Bank Corporation in 1995 and ultimately became a part of UBS.

== History ==
=== Founding and early history ===
This bank was founded in 1946 by Siegmund Warburg, Erich Körner and Henry Grunfeld. Siegmund was a member of the Warburg family, a prominent German-Jewish banking family. Erich Körner became an authorized signatory of Bank Winter & Co. AG in Vienna, Austria in 1921. Henry Grunfeld was a former industrialist in the German steel industry, and was also Jewish. Warburg and Grunfeld fled Nazi Germany in the 1930s.

S. G. Warburg and Co. was recognised for its pioneering mergers and takeover work in the UK in the 1960s. These works included the first ever hostile takeover in the UK and the first-ever Eurobond issue, which fostered the new Eurodollar market. The firm's acquisition of Seligman Bros. in 1957 was a significant event in its rise to prominence; through this, Warburg gained a place on the Accepting Houses Committee, which is composed of the 17 top merchant banks with access to cheap capital backed by the Bank of England.

In 1958–1959, Tube Investments, advised by S. G. Warburg & Co, fought a fierce and ultimately successful battle to acquire British Aluminium in a bidding war with a consortium of City of London bankers led by Morgan Grenfell. This battle is now remembered as the "Aluminium War" and started a shift away from relational banking towards competitive banking.

=== The 1960s, 1970s, and 1980s ===
The bank gained clients and grew rapidly in the 1960s and 1970s. In the early 1970s, S. G. Warburg entered into a U.S. joint venture with Paris-based Paribas (Banque de Paris et des Pays-Bas, prior to the bank's nationalisation in 1982) named Mercury Securities. In 1974, S. G. Warburg and Paribas took a 40% interest in A.G. Becker & Co., a U.S.-based brokerage. Although the joint venture initially provided an international dimension for its three members, the relationships soured in the late 1970s and early 1980s. The joint venture was plagued by competition between Warburg and Paribas, as well as cultural conflicts between French, English, and American executives. Although Warburg had originally planned to buy out Paribas, after Siegmund Warburg's death, Paribas bought out Warburg's interest in the joint venture in early 1983. Following the departure of Warburg from the joint venture, the firm was renamed A.G. Becker Paribas.

A major participant in the "Big Bang" reforms of the 1980s under the leadership of its chief executive Sir David Scholey, it acquired stockjobber Ackroyd & Smithers, stockbroker Rowe & Pitman, and the government gilt broker Mullens & Co. in August 1984. The bank became the preeminent UK-based M&A (merger and acquisition) adviser, equity underwriter, research house and (via its Mercury Asset Management subsidiary) asset manager by the early 1990s. At its peak more than half the companies on the FTSE 100 used Mercury Asset Management for investment management purposes.

=== Swiss Bank Corporation acquisition ===
Following another flawed and costly expansion into the United States, in 1994 a merger was announced with Morgan Stanley, but the talks collapsed.

The following year S. G. Warburg was purchased by Swiss Bank Corporation. Swiss Bank Corporation merged S. G. Warburg with its own existing investment banking unit to create SBC Warburg, which became a leading player in global investment banking. In 1997, SBC Warburg was merged with U.S. investment bank Dillon, Read & Co. to create Warburg Dillon Read.

After the merger of Swiss Bank Corporation and Union Bank of Switzerland in 1998, Warburg Dillon Read was renamed, UBS Warburg. The Warburg name was finally retired in 2003 when the investment banking operation of UBS was renamed UBS Investment Bank.

== Notable current and former employees ==
=== Business ===
- Thomas Bscher, former managing director of Bugatti Automobiles SAS
- Simon Cairns, 6th Earl Cairns, managing director 1979–1985
- Michael Cohrs, Member of Court and Financial Policy Committee Bank of England
- John Cryan, chief financial officer, UBS AG
- Paul Desmarais, Jr., co-chief of Power Corporation of Canada
- Sir Derek Higgs, chairman of Alliance & Leicester
- Nicola Horlick, founder of Bramdean Asset Management
- Sir Hugh Stevenson, Chairman of Mercury Asset Management (1992–1998), Chairman of Equitas (1998–2009)
- Ian Wace, CEO of Marshall Wace
- Peter Wilmot-Sitwell, board member of the Stock Exchange

=== Politics ===
- Peter Ainsworth, former Shadow Environment Secretary
- Robin Budenberg, former chief executive, UK Financial Investments
- Korn Chatikavanij, former finance minister for Thailand
- David Freud, Parliamentary Under Secretary of State for Work and Pensions
- William Hopper, former Member of the European Parliament
- Earl Jellicoe, former Lord Privy Seal
- James Leigh-Pemberton, chief executive, UK Financial Investments
- James Sassoon, joined S.G. Warburg in 1985, became a director in 1995 and from 2000 to 2002 served as vice-chairman
- Baroness Vadera, former minister jointly for the Department for Business, Innovation and Skills and the Cabinet Office

=== Other ===
- Hanns Alexander, the captor of Rudolf Höss, Kommandant of Auschwitz
- Anthony Marreco, one of the founding directors of Amnesty International

== See also ==
- Dillon Read
- Warburg Dillon Read
- M.M.Warburg & CO

== Bibliography ==
- WetFeet.com (2001). The WetFeet.com Insider Guide: Warburg Dillon Read. San Francisco, CA: WetFeet.com. ISBN 1-58207-078-4.
- Chernow, Ron (1993). The Warburgs: The Twentieth-century Odyssey of a Remarkable Jewish Family. New York: Random House. ISBN 0-679-41823-7.
- Attali, Jacques (1985). A Man of Influence: The Extraordinary Career of S.G. Warburg. Bethesda, MD: Adler & Adler. ISBN 0-917561-36-8.
- Farrer, David (1974). The Warburgs: The Story of a Family. New York: Stein and Day. ISBN 0-8128-1733-8.
