= Siegmund George Warburg =

German-born English banker (1902–1982)

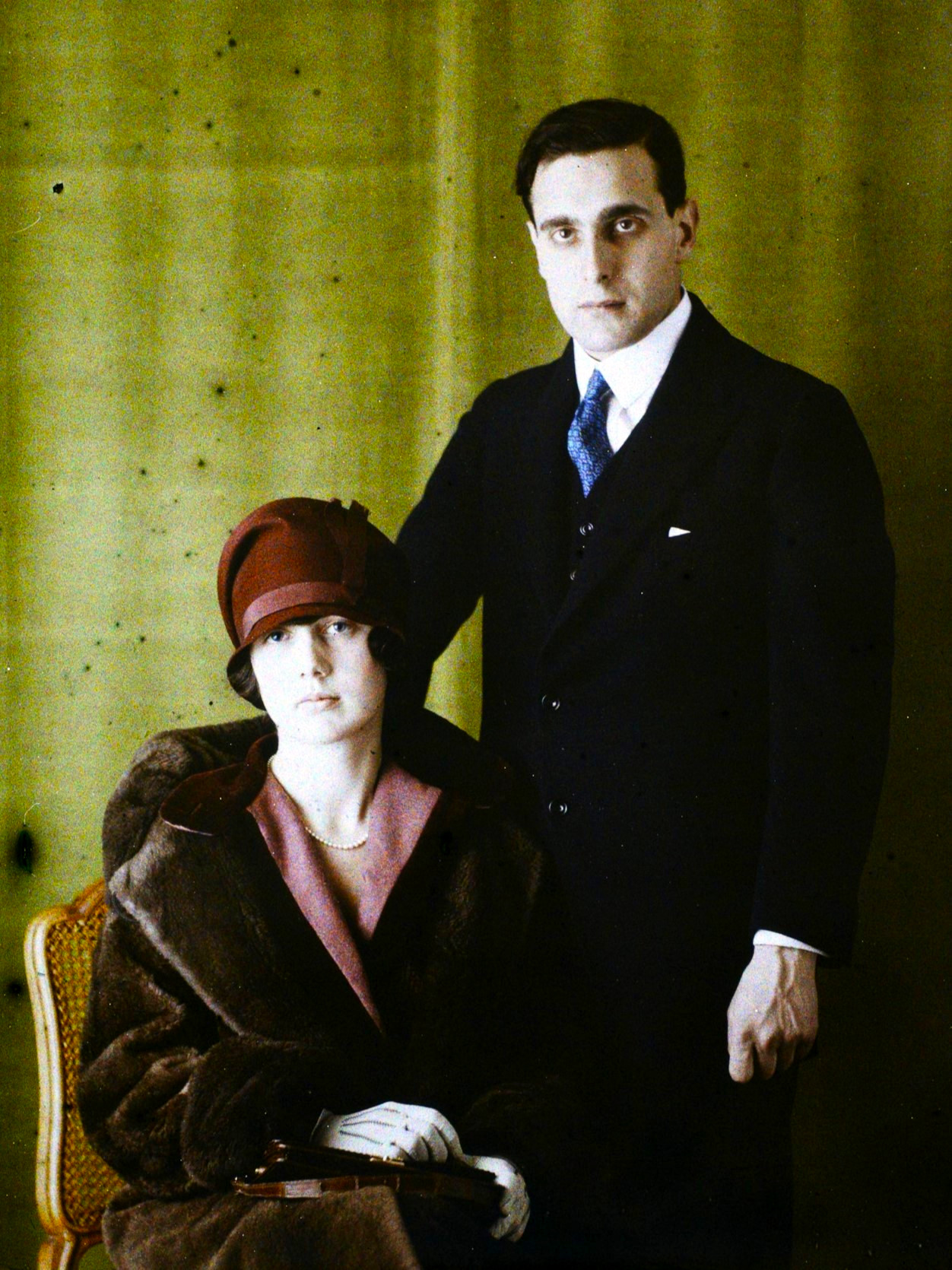
- Autochrome of Sir Siegmund Warburg with his wife Eva Maria Warburg, by Georges Chevalier, 1926.
- Born: 30 September 1902; Seeburg, Germany
- Died: 18 October 1982 (aged 80); London, United Kingdom
- Occupation: Banker

Sir Siegmund George Warburg (30 September 1902 – 18 October 1982) was a German-born Jewish-English banker. He was a member of the prominent Warburg family. He played a prominent role in the development of merchant banking.

== Career ==
He was born in the village of Seeburg, Germany (today part of Bad Urach), the only child of Georges Siegmund Warburg and his wife, Lucie, who raised young Siegmund on an estate (Uhenfels Castle) in Swabia in South West Germany far away from the main branch of the family, which operated the second largest bank in Hamburg. Siegmund had a sincere and deep affection for his mother who taught him to have a critical and inquisitive mind.

In the period immediately before the Second World War he worked under cover for the Z Organisation, a highly secret offshoot of MI6/SIS, and reported from Switzerland on his regular meetings with Hjalmar Schacht, then the president of the Nazi German Reichsbank and thus the most powerful German banker. He was forced to flee the National Socialist regime of Adolf Hitler and moved to the United Kingdom in 1934 where he co-founded S. G. Warburg & Co. in 1946 with Henry Grunfeld.

In the UK, Siegmund was considered an 'upstart' to the establishment in the City of London. His most famous achievement was the establishment of the EuroBond market. He firmly believed that financial integration of Europe was an essential and natural step in the development of the European economy. He was a firm supporter of European integration and involved in organizations dedicated to this goal, like the Action Committee for the United States of Europe, the United Kingdom Council of the European Movement, the European Foundation or the Bilderberg group (Warburg 2010: pp. xx, 460).

The firm that he created with Grunfeld, S.G. Warburg & Co., was a major British investment bank (merchant bank at the time), and Siegmund was the bank's managing director until the 1970s—when although he officially had retired and was living in Switzerland, still retained a personal secretary to draft correspondence and assist with the operations of the firm. Control of the firm S.G. Warburg and Co. was retained through a family controlled holding company called 'Mercury Securities', where stock was allocated to S.G. Warburg & Co. partners as well as his Swedish wife and children.

The firm S.G. Warburg & Co. was acquired by Swiss Bank Corporation creating SBC Warburg in 1995. After the merger of SBC with UBS AG, the investment bank was rebranded UBS. He was also simultaneously a partner in the U.S. investment bank Kuhn, Loeb from 1953 until 1964 through a holding company to avoid the restrictions of the Glass–Steagall Act.

== Personal life ==
Warburg was knighted in 1966. He died in London in 1982, survived by his wife Eva Maria (née Philipson), a son, a daughter and four grandchildren.
