= F. Abott Goodhue =

American banker

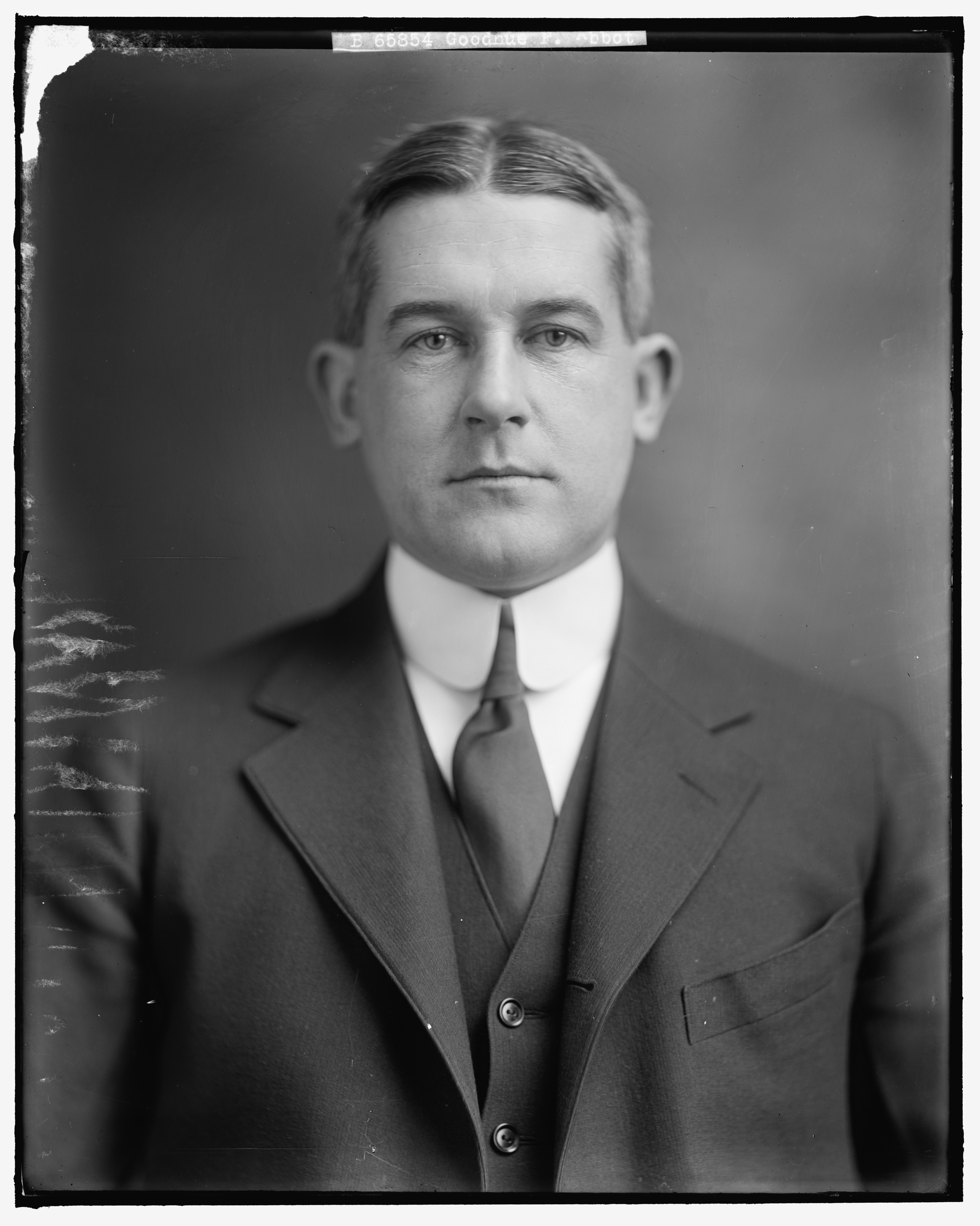
Photograph of Goodhue, 1905, Library of Congress

Francis Abott Goodhue Jr. (June 14, 1883 – June 1963) was an American banker who was the president of the Bank of the Manhattan Company from 1931 to 1948.

== Early life ==
Goodhue was born in Brookline, Massachusetts on June 14, 1883. He was a son of Francis Abott Goodhue (1847–1905) and Elizabeth Johnson (née Cushing) Goodhue. His siblings were Lawrence Cushing Goodhue (husband of Gertrude Munroe Smith, a daughter of Prof. Munroe Smith and granddaughter of Gen. Henry S. Huidekoper) and Elizabeth Cushing Goodhue (wife of Claude Fuess, Headmaster of Phillips Academy). His paternal grandparents were Samuel Goodhue and Mary Caroline (née Williams) Goodhue.

After graduating from Philips Academy in Andover, Massachusetts, he attended Harvard College where he graduated in 1906, followed by one year at Harvard Law School.

== Career ==
In 1907, Goodhue began his banking career as a messenger with First National Bank of Boston. He became president of the Brookline Trust Company in 1912 a year before he was named vice president of the First National Bank of Boston and engaged in foreign banking activities. In 1917, he established a branch of the bank in Buenos Aires, Argentina. In 1919, while at First National, he "inspired the formation" of the French American Banking Corporation of New York, serving as a director.

In 1921, Goodhue came to New York City to help organize the International Acceptance Bank, of which he served as president from 1921 until 1931, with James Warburg (the son of Paul Warburg) as his vice president. The International Acceptance Bank was acquired by the Bank of the Manhattan Company in 1929, with Goodhue becoming president and Warburg becoming chairman of the combined organization.

In 1929, he was elected president of the American Acceptance Council which had been founded by Paul Warburg in 1919. In 1931, he was succeeded by Charles S. McCain, chairman of the board of the Chase National Bank.

When International Acceptance merged with the Bank of the Manhattan Company in 1931, he became president of the combined bank serving in that role until his retirement in 1948 when he was succeeded by Lawrence C. Marshall.

=== Volunteer and philanthropic efforts ===
In 1918, Goodhue served as one of three representing the United States on the Interallied Committee for War, Purchases and Finance in London. In 1932, he began serving on the American Committee on Standstill Credits to Germany. He resigned in 1939 because the bank had no longer had any outstanding debts under the agreement.

In 1937, he accepted the chairmanship of the finance section in the United Hospitals Campaign. In that role, he directed the work of nineteen major solicitation groups on behalf of the ninety-two voluntary hospitals in the fund and the Visiting Nurse Association of Brooklyn.

In 1942, Governor Herbert H. Lehman nominated Goodhue to replace Mortimer N. Buckner on the State Banking Board, Group 1, which acted as an advisory "cabinet" to the New York State Superintendent of Banks. Group 1 was originally reserved for nominees of the ten banks with deposits of more than $150,000,000 when it was established in 1932.

After his retirement from the Manhattan Company in 1948, he continued to serve on the board until 1955 when the bank was merged with the Chase National Bank becoming the Chase Manhattan Bank. Goodhue served as a member of the bank's trust advisory board until his death in 1963.

== Personal life ==
Goodhue was married to Nora Forbes Thayer (1889–1988). She was a daughter of the former Evelyn Duncan Forbes and prominent ornithologist John Eliot Thayer (the twin brother of yachtsman Bayard Thayer). Her paternal grandparents were banker Nathaniel Thayer Jr. and Cornelia Van Rensselaer Thayer (a daughter of Stephen Van Rensselaer IV). Together, they were the parents of:

- Francis Abott Goodhue III (1916–1990), a Harvard Law School graduate who married Mary Elizabeth Brier, a daughter of Ernest Brier of Grosse Pointe, Michigan, a vice president of the Parke‐Davis Company, in 1948. Mary, also a lawyer, was elected to the New York State Assembly in 1975 and the New York State Senate in 1979.
- Phoebe Thayer Goodhue (1919–2019), who had her debut in 1937 at the Corinthian Room of The Pierre. She married Lt. Warren Winslow (1918–1944) in 1942. After his death in January 1944 while serving with the U.S. Navy, she married Gerrish H. Milliken Jr. (1917–2015), a brother of Roger Milliken, grandson of Seth M. Milliken of Milliken & Company, and great-grandson of Seth L. Milliken, in 1946.
- John Thayer Goodhue (1925-2024), a vice president of international sales with the West India Shipping Company in New York, who married Charlotte Barton Streeter (1927–2013), a daughter of Edward Streeter, in 1949.
- Stephen Van Rensselaer Goodhue (1929–2011), a former senior vice president with Manufacturers Hanover Trust Company and president of the Visiting Nurse Service of New York who married Judith (née Relles) Wiener, a daughter of Nathan Relles, in 1986.

Goodhue died of a heart attack at his home, 16 Ives Road, Hewlett on Long Island, in June 1963. They also had a home in Lancaster.

=== Descendants ===
Through his son Francis, he was a grandfather of Francis Abott Goodhue IV, who married Evelyn Treat Cutler, a daughter of Philip Cutler of Dresden Mills, Maine (the founding headmaster of the Brookwood School in Manchester-by-the-Sea), in 1976.
