= Caleb O. Halsted =

American merchant and banker

President of the Bank of the Manhattan Company
- In office 1847–1860
- Preceded by: Jonathan Thompson
- Succeeded by: James M. Morrison

Personal details
- Born: Caleb Ogden Halsted; June 13, 1792 Elizabeth, New Jersey
- Died: October 4, 1860 (aged 68) New York City, New York
- Spouse: Caroline Louisa Pitney (m. 1823; died 1860)
- Children: 5
- Parent(s): Matthias Halsted; Nancy Norris

Caleb Ogden Halsted (June 13, 1792 – October 7, 1860) was an American merchant and banker.

== Early life ==
Halsted was born in Elizabeth, New Jersey on June 13, 1792. He was the third son of Maj. Matthias Halsted (1759–1824) and Nancy (née Norris) Halsted. His elder brother was Nathaniel Norris Halsted, who married Lucretia Perrine. As his brother died young, Caleb adopted his nephew, Nathaniel Norris Halsted Jr. (later a Civil War General), and raised him. His father served as Brigade Major on the staff of Gen. Winds, aide-de-camp to Gen. Philemon Dickinson, and quartermaster in the Continental Army during the American Revolution.

The patriarch of the Halsted family was Timothy Halsted, who emigrated from England to America as early as 1660 and settled in Hempstead, New York before relocating to Elizabethtown. His paternal grandparents were Caleb Halsted Jr. and Rebecca (née Ogden) Halsted. His grandmother was a daughter of Robert Ogden who was a grandson of colonist John Ogden, an original patentee of the Elizabethtown Purchase, "the first English settlement in the Colony of New Jersey." His mother was, therefore, a first cousin of U.S. Senator and Governor of New Jersey Aaron Ogden and Col. Matthias Ogden.

== Career ==
Halsted began his career as a cloth merchant. In 1847, however, he was made president of the Bank of the Manhattan Company, succeeding Jonathan Thompson, who had been made president in 1840. In 1853, the Manhattan Company became one of the original 52 members of the New York Clearing House Association and Halsted became its first president. Halsted served as president until his death in October 1860. Later that year, the board of directors promoted James M. Morrison as president of the bank to succeed Halsted.

== Personal life ==
In December 1823, Halsted was married to Caroline Louisa Pitney (1796–1879), a daughter of Dr. Aaron Pitney and Anna Bowne (née Proovost) Pitney. Together, they were the parents of five children, three of whom died in infancy, including:

- Pitney Halsted (1824–1825), who died in infancy.
- Lucinetta "Lucy" Halsted (1825–1912), who married Col. John Kean, son of Peter Philip James Kean and Sarah Sabina Morris, (Note: Peter Philip James Kean was the only child born of John Kean, the cashier of the Bank of the United States and a Continental Congressmen, and Susan (née Livingston) Kean (1759–1853). After his father's early death in 1795, his mother hired Count Julian Niemcewicz as his tutor. Niemcewicz, a Polish nobleman who fled Poland after fighting unsuccessfully for Polish independence, later married Kean's mother in 1800.) in 1847.
- Caroline Halsted (1827–1848), who married William Henry Morris, a son of James Morris and Helen Van Cortlandt, (Note: James Morris, who served as Sheriff of New York County, was the fourth son of Mary (née Walton) Morris and Founding Father Lewis Morris, 3rd Lord of the Manor of Morrisania, who was a prominent landowner who was a signer of the U.S. Declaration of Independence as a delegate to the Continental Congress from New York.) in 1846.
- Edwin Halsted (1829–1829), who died in infancy.
- Theodore Halsted (1830–1831), who died in infancy.

Halsted died on October 7, 1860, in Manhattan. After a funeral at the Presbyterian Church on University Place and 10th Street in Manhattan, he was buried in the churchyard of the First Presbyterian Church of Elizabeth. His widow died in New York on July 1, 1879.

=== Descendants ===
Through his daughter Lucy, he was a grandfather of nine, including Caroline Morris Kean (1849–1887) (wife of U.S. Assistant Secretary of State George L. Rives), U.S. Representative and U.S. Senator John Kean (1852–1914), U.S. Senator Hamilton Fish Kean (1862–1941) (who married Katharine Taylor Winthrop), and Christine Griffin Kean (who married Emlen Roosevelt).
