= J. Stewart Baker =

American banker

President of Chase Manhattan Bank
- In office March 31, 1955 – December 31, 1957
- Preceded by: Inaugural holder
- Succeeded by: George Champion

Personal details
- Born: John Stewart Baker; August 6, 1893 Lawrence, New York
- Died: September 5, 1966 (aged 73) Morristown, New Jersey
- Spouse: Marianne Lathrop Foote (m. 1915)
- Relations: Stephen Baker (grandfather); William Farquhar Payson (uncle)
- Children: 4
- Parent(s): Stephen Baker; Mary Dabney Payson Baker
- Education: Princeton University

John Stewart Baker (August 6, 1893 – September 5, 1966) was an American banker who served as the first president of the Chase Manhattan Bank.

== Early life ==
Baker was born on August 6, 1893, on Long Island, in Lawrence, New York. He was the son of Stephen Baker (1859–1946) and Mary Dabney (née Payson) Baker (1865–1948), who married in 1890. His father served as president and chairman of the board of the Bank of the Manhattan Company, the earliest predecessor of Chase Bank, and was an associate of John D. Rockefeller Jr.

His paternal grandparents were Anna Mary (née Greene) Baker and Stephen Baker, a Republican U.S. Representative from New York during the Civil War who made a fortune as an importer of woollen goods and was a son of Stephen Baker, a merchant who was one of the original stockholders in the Manhattan Company, founded by Aaron Burr in 1799. His maternal grandparents were Francis Payson and Mary (née Dabney) Payson. His uncle was noted author and publisher William Farquhar Payson.

Baker graduated from Princeton University in 1915. After leaving Princeton, he joined the Bankers Trust Company as a bank messenger before being assigned to work in the trust department. At the outbreak of World War I, he joined the U.S. Navy as an ensign. He was discharged in January 1919.

== Career ==
After the war, he joined the Bank of the Manhattan Company, where his father was president, becoming an assistant cashier in the Union Square office of the bank in 1919 before being elected vice president the following year. In 1922, he was elected a director of the Bank and moved to the main office at 40 Wall Street, serving in the Trust department.

In 1927, after thirty-four years as president, his father turned over the presidency and considerable stock ownership to the younger Baker, who had just turned thirty-four. Within a year of assuming the presidency, Baker acquired the Flushing National Bank, the Bayside National Bank, the Queens-Bellaire Bank, the First National Bank of Whitestone, the Bronx Borough Bank, and the First National Bank of Brooklyn. The acquisitions led to the bank having sixty-one offices throughout New York City.

In December 1928, Baker guided the 129-year-old Bank of the Manhattan Company to a joint affiliation with the International Acceptance Bank, Inc., which had been organized in 1921 by Paul Warburg. Each institution retained its corporate identity, but the Bank of the Manhattan Company shareholders owned the stock of the International Acceptance Bank. (Note: During the 1928 affiliation announcement, The New York Times noted that Baker's great-grandfather was one of the original stockholders of the Manhattan Company in 1799; similarly, the Warburg family banking firm of M. M. Warburg & Co. (the most closely affiliated to International Acceptance), had been founded by Paul Warburg's great-grandfather in Hamburg in 1798, a year before the Manhattan Company.) In 1932, he was chosen as chairman of the board and served in that role until March 31, 1955, when the Bank of the Manhattan Company merged with the Chase National Bank to form the second-largest commercial banking institution in the country. Baker became president and chairman of the executive committee of the merged institution, which started out with deposits in excess of $6.8 billion. He retired on December 31, 1957, but continued as a director of Chase Manhattan until August 11, 1965.

In 1953, he was elected president of the St. Luke's Hospital board of trustees.

== Personal life ==
In 1915, Baker was married to Marianne Lathrop Foote (1894–1992), a daughter of Robert Dumont Foote and Marie Gilmour (née Hopkins) Foote. In 1933, they leased a large duplex apartment at 770 Park Avenue, the Rosario Candela-designed luxury apartment building. Together, they were the parents of:

- John Stewart Baker Jr. (d. 2003), who became a senior vice president of the Chase Manhattan Bank, president of the Alpha Portland Cement Co. in 1964 and president of the Garden State Bank.
- Barbara Dumont Baker (1916–2019), who married Richard Englis Baiter, an executive with Lever Brothers, in 1936. After his death, she married Frederic Welsh and Gordon MacPherson.
- Priscilla F. Baker (1921–2010), who married Serge Jerome Hill, a son of Lucian Hill, in 1942.
- Stephen Baker (1924–1950), who worked with the Bank of New York and the Fifth Avenue Bank; was engaged to Mary Watts Belcher at the time of his death.

A resident of the Short Hills section of Millburn, New Jersey, Baker died at the Morristown Memorial Hospital in New Jersey on September 5, 1966, after a short illness.
