= Samuel B. Gardiner =

Samuel Buel Gardiner (April 5, 1815 – January 5, 1882) was an American farmer, landowner, and politician from East Hampton, New York.

== Life ==
Gardiner was born on April 5, 1815 in Gardiners Island, New York, the son of John Lyon Gardiner and Sarah Griswold. He was a descendant of Lion Gardiner, and his father was the seventh proprietor of Gardiners Island. He was born on the island, and in 1836 he moved to East Hampton.

Gardiner attended Clinton Academy in East Hampton, Union Hall in Jamaica, and Dwight's Seminary in New Haven, Connecticut. He then worked as a farmer. He served as Justice of the Peace from 1843 to 1847 and Town Supervisor in 1845. He served in the New York State Assembly in 1846 as one of two representatives from Suffolk County, the other being Richard A. Udall. When his older brother John Griswold Gardiner died, he became the tenth proprietor of Gardiners Island. Under him, the estate grew more productive and the income it produced doubled in a short amount of time.

In 1875, Gardiner was elected back to the New York State Assembly as a Democrat, representing Suffolk County. He won the election over Republican incumbent Nathan D. Petty. He served in the Assembly in 1876. He lived in Gardiners Island from 1861, when his brother John died and he became the new proprietor of the island, to 1881, when poor health compelled him to move back to East Hampton.

In 1837, Gardiner married Mary Gardiner Thompson, daughter of Collector of the Port of New York Jonathan Thompson and sister of New York Life Insurance and Trust Company president David Thompson. Their children were Mary Thompson (wife of William R. Sands), David Johnson, John Lion, Jonathan Thompson, and Sarah Griswold (wife of John Alexander Tyler, son of President John Tyler and Julia Gardiner). David and John were the 11th and 12th proprietors of Gardiners Island respectively.

Gardiner died at home on January 5, 1882. His funeral was held in the East Hampton church. He was buried in Gardiners Island.

New York State Assembly
Preceded by Nathan D. Petty	New York State Assembly; Suffolk County; 1876	Succeeded by Francis Brill
