= Lawrence C. Marshall =

American banker

Lawrence Clark Marshall (April 13, 1904 – November 29, 1972) was an American banker who served as president of the Bank of the Manhattan Company and, later, vice chairman of the Chase Manhattan Bank.

== Early life ==
Marshall was born on April 13, 1904, in Orange, New Jersey, a son of Howard Marshall, vice president of the Irving Trust Company in New York. He graduated from Dartmouth College.

== Career ==
Marshall began his banking career in 1925 with the American Exchange National Bank in New York. In 1934, he moved to the United States Trust Company of New York before joining the Bank of the Manhattan Company in 1946. Two years later, in 1948, Marshall was appointed president of the Bank of the Manhattan Company to succeed F. Abott Goodhue. He served in that role until 1955, when the bank merged with Chase National Bank. After the merger, he served as executive vice president in charge of Chase Manhattan Bank's Metropolitan department until 1961. In that role, he supervised the bank's business operations in New York City at the head office and the branches. In 1961, he was named vice chairman of the board of directors, serving until his retirement in 1969.

He was also a member of the investment advisory committee of the Commercial Union Insurance Company of New York, a director of the Grand Union Company, the Anaconda Company, the Moore & McCormack Company and the American-Hawaiian Steamship Company. He had also been a trustee of The Bank for Savings of New York, Manhattan Eye, Ear and Throat Hospital, the New York University Bellevue Medical Center, and chairman of the New York Heart Association, and treasurer of the American University of Beirut.

== Personal life ==
In 1929, Marshall was married to Sylvia Hathaway Hitch (1906–1999), a daughter of Allerton Delano Hitch of South Orange. Together, they were the parents of two sons and a daughter:

- Allerton Delano Marshall (b. 1931), who married Patricia Ann Taussig, a daughter of Charles William Taussig, who was chairman and president of the American Molasses Company, in 1954. They divorced and he later married Mary (née Markley) Pollard, a daughter of Max Markley, in 1987.
- Sylvia Lea Marshall (1937–2006), who married Roy Ferguson. She later married Alkema.
- David Lawrence Marshall (b. 1939). He married Lucy Haldane Smith in 1961 and later Lynette Lalond Hembre in 1999

After a long illness, Marshall died at the Sarasota Memorial Hospital in Sarasota, Florida, on November 29, 1972. After a memorial service at St. James' Episcopal Church at Madison Avenue and 71st Street, he was buried at Saint Stephens Episcopal Cemetery in Millburn, New Jersey.
