= Bettina Warburg =

American psychiatrist (1900–1990)

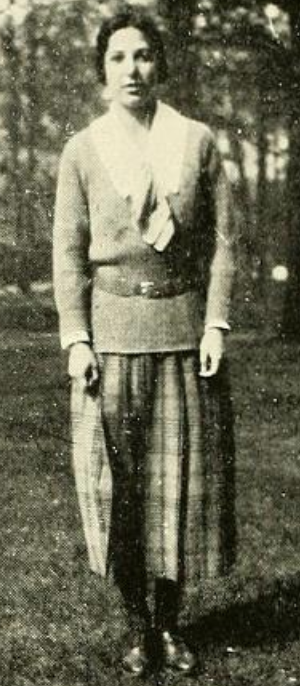
- Bettina Warburg, from the 1921 yearbook of Bryn Mawr College
- Born: Bettina N. Warburg; November 21, 1900; Free City of Hamburg (present-day Germany)
- Died: November 25, 1990; New York City, U.S
- Education: Bryn Mawr College; Cornell University Medical School
- Occupation: Psychiatrist
- Spouse: Samuel Bonarions Grimson
- Parent(s): Nina Loeb; Paul Warburg

Bettina Warburg (November 21, 1900 – November 25, 1990) was a psychiatrist and a member of the Warburg family banking dynasty.

== Early life ==
Bettina Warburg was born in Hamburg, Germany, to Paul Moritz Warburg and Nina Jenny (Loeb) Warburg. She was the younger sister of James Paul Warburg. The family immigrated to the United States in 1902, although they continued to travel between Germany and the United States quite often. Bettina and her father and brother were naturalized in 1911. Bettina attended the Brearley School in New York followed by Bryn Mawr College and the Cornell University Medical School.

== Work as a psychiatrist ==
Warburg trained as a psychiatrist at the National Hospital for Nervous Diseases in London, after which she worked at the Boston Psychopathic Hospital and at Harvard University's pathology lab. In 1932, she started a private psychiatric practice at the New York Psychoanalytic Institute, where she remained until her retirement in 1967. In addition to her private practice, Warburg taught at the New York Hospital-Cornell Medical Center's Payne Whitney Psychiatric Clinic from 1932 to 1940, and was a clinical assistant professor of psychiatry from 1965 to 1967.

== War-time relief work ==
In 1938, Warburg and Lawrence S. Kubie, the newly elected president of the New York Psychoanalytic Society, organized the New York Committee of the National Committee for the Resettlement of Foreign Physicians, a sub-committee of the National Coordinating Committee for Aid to Refugees and Emigrants Coming from Germany's (NCC) Resettlement Division. Warburg also served as the co-chairman of the Emergency Committee on Relief and Immigration of the American Psychoanalytic Association from 1938 to 1948. These rescue committees provided passports, money, and jobs in the United States and Allied Europe for Jewish psychoanalysts affected by the rise of Nazism. Between 1938 and 1943, Warburg was instrumental in organizing and financing the emigration of 154 Jewish psychiatrists and psychoanalysts from Germany and Austria. Much of this was done using her own and her family's money.

== Later life ==
Bettina Warburg married musician Samuel Bonarios Grimson, ex-husband of Malvina Hoffman in 1942, although she continued to use her maiden name in her work. Bettina Warburg died at her home in Manhattan on Sunday, November 25, 1990, at the age of 90. She is buried in a family plot in Sleepy Hollow Cemetery in Sleepy Hollow, New York.
