= Stephen Baker (New York politician) =

American politician

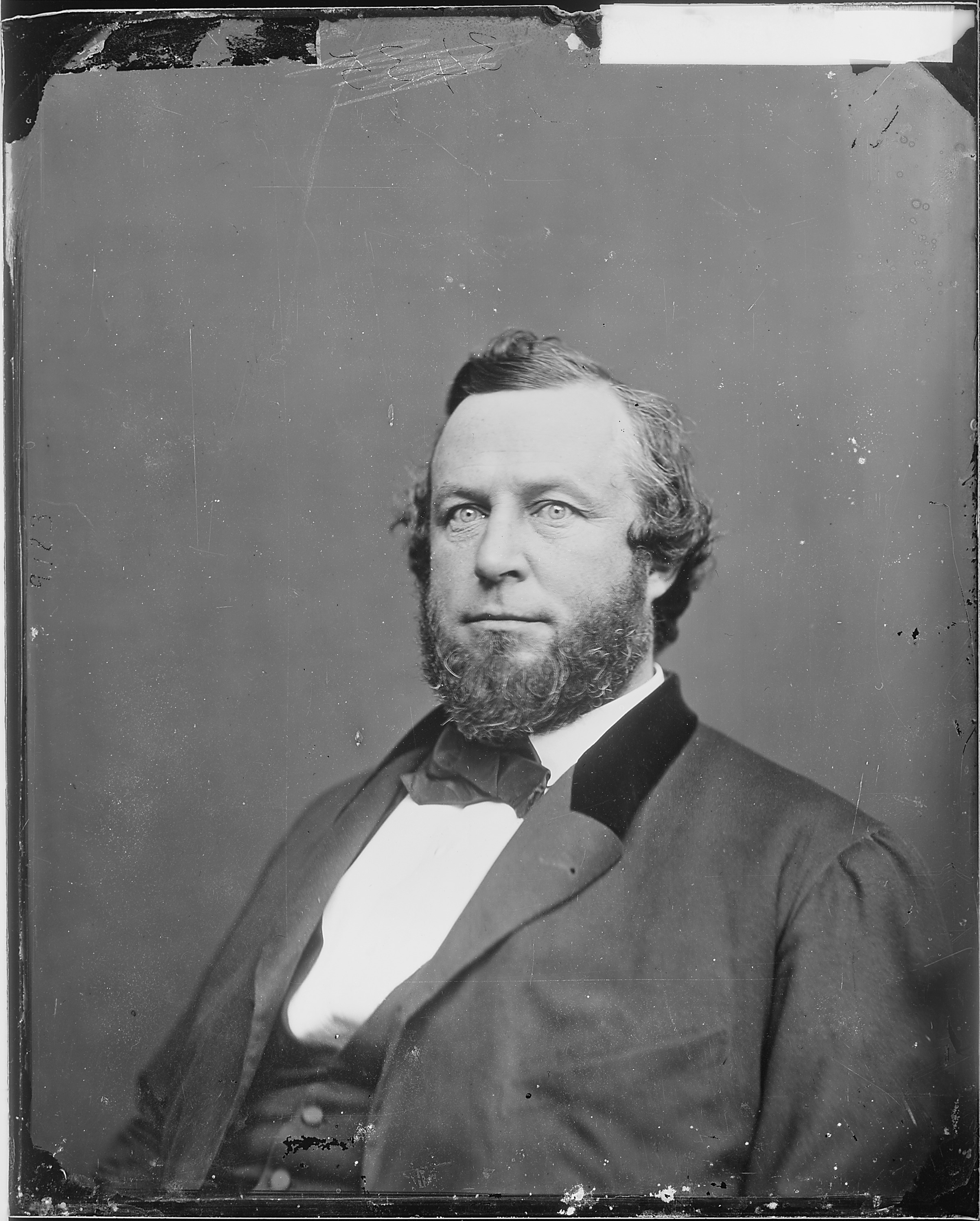

Member of the U.S. House of Representatives from New York's 12th district
- In office March 4, 1861 – March 4, 1863
- Preceded by: Charles L. Beale
- Succeeded by: John H. Ketcham

Personal details
- Born: August 12, 1819 New York City, New York, United States
- Died: June 9, 1875 (aged 55) Ogden, Utah
- Party: Republican
- Spouse: Anna Mary Greene
- Relations: J. Stewart Baker (grandson)
- Children: Stephen Baker
- Profession: Politician, woolen importer

Stephen Baker (August 12, 1819 – June 9, 1875) was an American politician and businessman who was a U.S. representative from New York from 1861 to 1863, during the American Civil War.

== Early life ==
Baker was born in New York City, New York on August 12, 1819. He was a son of Stephen Baker, a merchant who was one of the original stockholders in the Manhattan Company, founded in 1799. He attended the common schools.

== Career ==
In 1850, Baker engaged as importer of woolen goods, and moved to Poughkeepsie, New York.

He was elected as a Republican to the Thirty-seventh Congress, serving as a U.S. representative for the twelfth district of New York from March 4, 1861 to March 4, 1863. After his term in office, he abandoned active business pursuits and lived in retirement until his death.

== Personal life ==
Baker was married to Anna Mary Greene (1827–1903). Together, they were the parents of:

- Stephen Baker (1859–1946), who served as president and chairman of the board of the Bank of the Manhattan Company, the earliest predecessor of Chase Bank, and an associate of John D. Rockefeller Jr. Baker married Mary Dabney Payson (1865–1948), a daughter of Francis Payson and sister of William Farquhar Payson, in 1890.

While en route to California for his health, on a train near Ogden, Utah, Baker died on June 9, 1875, aged 55 years and 301 days. He was interred at the Poughkeepsie Rural Cemetery in Poughkeepsie.

U.S. House of Representatives
Preceded by Charles L. Beale	Representative of the 12th Congressional District of New York; March 4, 1861 – March 4, 1863	Succeeded by John H. Ketcham
