= Brain trust =

Group of close advisers to a politician

Brain trust was a term that originally described a group of close advisers to a political candidate or incumbent; these were often academics who were prized for their expertise in particular fields. The term is most associated with the group of advisors of Franklin D. Roosevelt during his presidential administration. More recently, however, the use of the term has expanded beyond politics to encompass any specialized group of advisers aligned to a decision maker.

== Etymology ==
Early use of the term "brain trust" was patterned on the use of the term "trust" to depict economic consolidation within an industry. This was a subject of much interest at the time and led to the Sherman Antitrust Act in 1890. In 1888 the Springfield [Missouri] Leader used the term in connection with the consolidation of newspapers in the state: "[Too many newspapers in Columbia, Mo.] overstocked the brain market of that town, and the Columbian and Statesman formed a 'trust.' ... While sugar, coffee, lumber, whiskey, iron, coal and other trusts are forming we can see no reason why a 'brain trust' can't be organized." Around the same time the Philadelphia Press penned a witticism concerning free traders that made the rounds of U.S. papers. The joke implies the lack of thought output, just as "trusts (consolidation of productive units) reduced industrial output: "Some of the free trade shouters display enough ignorance to excite a suspicion that they have been made the victims of a brain 'trust.'" Using the term as an analogy to industrial trusts seems to have spread widely in 1888. For example, lawyers who signed a fee-fixing agreement were called a "brain trust." In a long lament of the independence of small editors, the Marion [Ohio] Star says that a "Brains Trust" is evidenced by the "machine made" opinions of gullible editors.

Around the same time the term "brain trust" was employed in a slightly different sense by journalists covering Henry Cabot Lodge. During the Spanish–American War in 1898, a group of journalists would gather in Senator Lodge's committee room and discuss with him the progress of the war. Lodge called this group his "board of strategy," but the Senate press corp called it "the brain trust."

The sense of the term as depicting a collection of well informed experts was this sense that seemed to catch hold. For example, in 1901 a group of journalists in a state press association was called a "brain trust" by the Deseret Evening News. It was not long before the term described a group that was so expert that their advice would be almost inevitably agreed to and acted upon. Such was the reference to the eight senators who made up the "Brain Trust of the Senate" as described by William Allen White in the Saturday Evening Post. That use became regular for the next two decades, as can be seen from the use by Time magazine in 1928, which ran a headline on a meeting of the American Council on Learned Societies titled "Brain Trust".

== Roosevelt's "Brain Trust" ==
Franklin D. Roosevelt's speechwriter and legal counsel Samuel Rosenman suggested having an academic team to advise Roosevelt in March 1932. In 1932, The New York Times writer James Kieran first used the term Brains Trust (evolving to Brain Trust later) when he applied it to the close group of experts that surrounded United States then-presidential candidate Roosevelt. According to Brain Trust member Raymond Moley, Kieran coined the term. Rosenman, however, contended that it was Louis Howe, a close advisor to the President, who first used the term — but used it derisively in a conversation with Roosevelt.

The core of the Roosevelt brain trust initially consisted of a group of Columbia Law School professors (Moley, Tugwell, and Berle). These men played a key role in shaping the policies of the First New Deal (1933). Although they never met together as a group, they each had Roosevelt's ear. Many newspaper editorials and editorial cartoons ridiculed them as impractical idealists. The core group later shifted to men associated with Harvard Law School (Cohen, Corcoran, and Frankfurter), who played a key role in shaping the policies of the Second New Deal (1935–1936).

Rosenman recruited Moley and two of his colleagues at Columbia University, Rexford Tugwell and Adolf Berle. Their impact was immediate. The three men used their network in academia to connect Roosevelt with experts in business, agriculture, and labor. Roosevelt would invite these experts to extravagant dinners at the Governor's Mansion, prompting his guests with questions about their field that would spark riveting intellectual conversations. Before Roosevelt assumed the presidency, the members of the brain trust largely acted as speech writers, infusing their ideas on government and economics into the narratives used by Roosevelt to market himself to the American electorate. In the 1932 Presidential election, Berle authored Roosevelt's famous "Commonwealth Club Address", the speech that outlined his plan to use government to both save and make better the economy. Moley is largely credited with writing the majority of Roosevelt's first inaugural address. The idea of likening Roosevelt's coming task to commanding a war effort originated from Moley.

By the time Roosevelt entered the White House in January 1933, his brain trust advisors were preparing him to make big government decisions about banking and securities, agriculture, and industry - actions that would become the crux of the First New Deal. Harry Hopkins, an early addition to the brain trust, soon emerged as the most profound example of the new governing ethic ushered in by the brain trust. Hopkins, who is best known for leading the Works Progress Administration (WPA), profusely believed in using government to strengthen the welfare of American citizens. This ethic extended across the group's members and would largely come to define the enduring legacy of the brain trust as a political force.

The "first New Deal" lasted from about 1933-34, and was used primarily for the recovery of the economy, with the secondary priorities of relief and reform. The most important structural achievements of the first New Deal were the establishment of the National Recovery Administration (NRA) and the Agricultural Adjustment Administration, both conceived in large part by members of Roosevelt's brain trust. Hugh Johnson, another early addition to the brain trust, was appointed to lead the NRA. Rexford Tugwell was appointed to lead the AAA, which he largely designed, until it was ruled unconstitutional.

The brain trust was hardly a monolithic unit. Some members, such as Berle, largely served as informal advisors to Roosevelt, while others, such as Hopkins, were shuffled throughout the executive branch based on where they were most needed. The members also were not always allies in their service to the president. The most famous example of this is in what Roosevelt himself dubbed a "stimulating rivalry": the competition between Harry Hopkins and later brain trust member Harold Ickes. By the time of the "second New Deal" (roughly 1935-36), the brain trust members were largely (but not exclusively) operating in formal roles throughout the federal bureaucracy. Ickes served as head of the Public Works Administration (PWA), while Hopkins was leading the WPA. While both administrations were used to relieve unemployment brought on by the Great Depression, their respective leaders had competing philosophies on how best to achieve that end. Hopkins favored larger range of shorter-term projects to maximize employment opportunity. Ickes, on the other hand, supported larger scale and long-term projects that were designed to create stable jobs that would produce critical infrastructure. The two leaders frequently criticized the others' philosophy and projects, and both men competed for Roosevelt's favor. Presidential historian Doris Kearns Goodwin attributes the existence of this rivalry, and the lack of an attempt by Roosevelt to mitigate its obviousness, to the president's fervent belief in stimulating competition and debate, the result of which is the betterment of public policy.

=== Members ===
==== First New Deal ====
- Adolf Berle
- Samuel Rosenman
- Basil O'Connor
- Hugh S. Johnson
- Raymond Moley (Moley broke with Roosevelt and became a sharp critic of the New Deal from the right)
- Rexford Tugwell
- Frances Perkins
- Harry Hopkins
- Harold L. Ickes
- George F. Warren
- Charles William Taussig
- Louis Brandeis
- James Warburg

==== Second New Deal ====
- Benjamin V. Cohen
- Thomas Gardiner Corcoran
- Felix Frankfurter

==== Other advisers ====
- Louis Howe
- James A. Farley
- Paul M. O'Leary
- George Peek
- Charles William Taussig
- Robert F. Wagner
- F. Palmer Weber

== See also ==
- Black Cabinet, a group of African Americans who served as public policy advisors to President Franklin D. Roosevelt and his wife Eleanor Roosevelt
- The Brains Trust, an informational BBC radio and later television programme popular in the United Kingdom during the 1940s and 1950s
- Kitchen Cabinet, a term used by political opponents of President of the United States Andrew Jackson to describe a collection of unofficial advisors he consulted
- Think tank, a research institute/center and organization that performs research and advocacy concerning topics such as social policy, political strategy, economics, military, technology, and culture.

== References and sources ==
Sources

- Moley, Raymond. (1939). After seven years
- Tugwell, Rexford. (1968). The Brains Trust
- Editorial cartoons
- Rosen, Elliot. (1977). Hoover, Roosevelt, and the Brains Trust.
- McElvaine, Robert. (1984). The Great Depression: America 1929–1941
