= James M. Morrison =

American banker

James M. Morrison (1805 – December 20, 1880) was an American banker who worked at the Bank of the Manhattan Company for more than forty years as teller, cashier and, finally, president from 1860 to 1879.

== Early life ==
Morrison was born in 1805 to Scotch parents in New Orleans, Louisiana, where his father had a winter residence. When he was still young, his father, a Louisiana planter, died which led to James and his mother returning to her native city of Aberdeen, Scotland. There, he was "carefully educated according to the rigid methods employed in the schools of that country."

In 1825, at the age of 19, Morrison decided to return to the United States to begin his career.

== Career ==
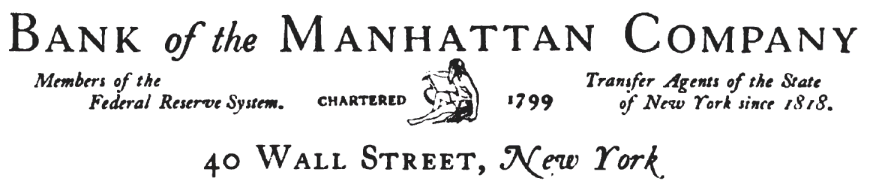
Manhattan Company (1799-1955) letterhead c. 1922

As a clerk in the United States and Merchant's Banks, Morrison became familiar with the banking system. In 1840, he joined the Bank of the Manhattan Company when it was still located in a brownstone at 40 Wall Street. He started his more than forty-year career with the Manhattan Company as its first teller, two years later in 1842 he was promoted to cashier and, worked "assiduously to improve the stock, which at that time was worth from 45 to 50 cents on the dollar." The board of directors elected him president of the Bank in 1860. According to his obituary in The New York Times:

"During the unsettled condition of business affairs which succeeded the war, Mr. Morrison manifested a shrewdness and ability which enabled him to survive the financial crash that ultimately resulted in the suspension of many other banking institutions."

In the latter part of 1879, his health began to decline and he resigned the presidency, although he continued to serve on the board of directors. Morrison was succeeded by John S. Harberger, who died of malarial fever a year later in October 1880.

== Personal life ==
Morrison was the father of David Mitchell Morrison (b. 1841), who served as president of the Washington Trust Company, and founded the banking firm of Morrison & Putnam. He married Abby Putnam, a daughter of Capt. Nathaniel Putnam of Brooklyn, in 1877.

He died on December 20, 1880, at 158 West 23rd Street, his residence in Manhattan. After a funeral at the South Reformed Church at Fifth Avenue and 21st Street, he was buried at Woodlawn Cemetery, Bronx. The pallbearers at his funeral were Samuel Sloan, George D. H. Gillespie, John Sloan, John Harsen Rhoades (a banker), George S. Coe (president of the American Exchange National Bank of New-York), Samuel D. Babcock (president of the Down Town Association), Jacob D. Vermilye (president of the Merchants' Bank), John A. Stewart, Nathaniel D. Putnam, and B. B. Sherman.

=== Descendants ===
Through his son David, he was a grandfather of Abby Morrison, who became a well known singer. After her marriage to William Wood Ricker (and engineer who was president of the Guarantee Construction Company), she was known as Abby Morrison Ricker.
