= Sage Automotive Interiors =

American automotive technical textile supplier

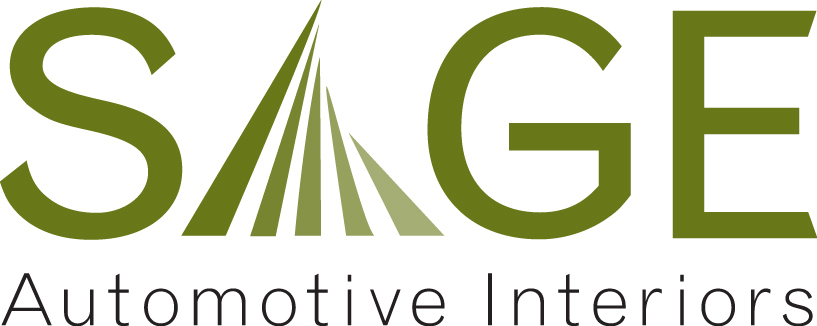
- Company type: Private
- Industry: Automotive interior textiles
- Founded: 2009 (as a carve-out of Milliken & Company's Automotive Body Cloth Division)
- Headquarters: Greenville, South Carolina (CU-ICAR campus), United States
- Area served: Worldwide
- Products: Automotive interior fabrics (seating, headliners, door panels)
- Parent: Asahi Kasei
- Website: www.sageautomotiveinteriors.com

Sage Automotive Interiors is an American supplier of automotive interior textiles, including fabrics used for vehicle seating, headliners and door panels. The company was formed in 2009 when Milliken & Company sold its Automotive Body Cloth Division to a management-led group and investors. Sage became a subsidiary of Japan-based Asahi Kasei following an acquisition announced in 2018.

== History ==
Sage originated in 1948 as the Automotive Body Cloth Division of Milliken & Company and was sold in 2009 to the division’s management team and investors, after which it was rebranded as Sage Automotive Interiors. In August 2011, the company moved its headquarters from Spartanburg, South Carolina to the Clemson University International Center for Automotive Research (CU-ICAR) campus in Greenville, South Carolina.

In 2016, Sage acquired the automotive manufacturing assets of Apollo S.p.A. in Italy and Romania.

In July 2018, Asahi Kasei agreed to acquire Sage Automotive Interiors in a deal reported by Reuters as valuing the transaction at about US$1.06 billion including debt. The acquisition was completed in September 2018 and Sage became a wholly owned subsidiary of Asahi Kasei.
