= David Gelston =

American politician (1744–1828)

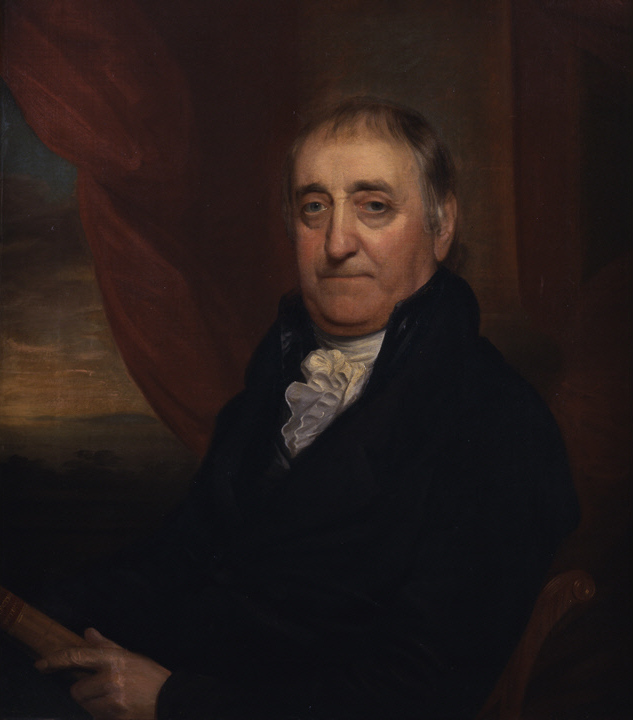
- Gelston, by John Wesley Jarvis, c. 1810-1815

Collector of the Port of New York
- In office 1801–1820
- Appointed by: Thomas Jefferson
- Preceded by: Joshua Sands
- Succeeded by: Jonathan Thompson

Speaker of the New York State Assembly
- In office 1784–1785
- Preceded by: John Hathorn
- Succeeded by: John Lansing Jr.

Personal details
- Born: July 4, 1744 Bridgehampton, Province of New York, British America
- Died: August 21, 1828 (aged 84) New York City, New York, U.S.
- Party: Democratic-Republican
- Spouse: Phoebe Mitchell
- Children: Phoebe Gelston Floyd; Maltby Gelston

David Gelston (July 4, 1744 – August 21, 1828) was an American merchant and politician.

== Early life ==
Gelston was born on July 4, 1744, in Bridgehampton in Suffolk County on Long Island in what was then the Province of New York. He was a son of Deacon Maltby Gelston and Mary (née Jones) Gelston. His maternal grandparents were Dr. Thomas Jones and Margaret (née Livingston) Jones (a daughter of Philip Livingston).

== Career ==
As the American Revolution approached, Gelston became politically active. He signed the Articles of Association in 1774, agreeing to avoid British imports, even though this hurt his own business. He represented Suffolk County in the New York Provincial Congress of 1775 to 1777, as well as the 1777 New York State Constitutional Convention that debated and enacted the first constitution of the State of New York. He was a Democratic-Republican and he worked closely with Aaron Burr.

He was a member from Suffolk County of the New York State Assembly from 1777 to 1785. During his last term, he was Speaker. As speaker, he took a leading role in reconciling the differences between Tory and Whig factions. He oversaw the repeal of all the laws that had imposed civil and legal penalties on Tories.

In 1787, he removed to New York City, and from 1787 to 1801, was Surrogate of New York County. In 1789, the State Assembly appointed him a delegate to the last session of the Continental Congress. He was a member of the New York State Senate from 1791 to 1794, and from 1798 to 1802.

In 1801, Gelston was appointed Collector of the Port of New York by President Thomas Jefferson, and held that post until 1821 when he retired.

== Personal life ==
Gelston was married to Phoebe Mitchell (1753–1836). Together, they were the parents of:

- Phoebe Gelston (1771–1836), who married Nicoll Floyd, the son of William Floyd.
- Maltby Gelston (1772–1860), who was a member of the New York State Assembly and who served as president of the Bank of the Manhattan Company.

In 1792, Gelston commissioned Charles Willson Peale to paint a portrait of him along with a companion piece of his wife and daughter. This painting is currently displayed at the La Salle Art Museum.

Gelston died on August 21, 1828, in New York City. He was buried in the First Presbyterian Church Cemetery in New York.

Political offices
Preceded by John Hathorn	Speaker of the New York State Assembly; 1784–1785	Succeeded by John Lansing Jr.
Government offices
Preceded by Joshua Sands	Collector of the Port of New York; 1801–1820	Succeeded by Jonathan Thompson
