= Nathan D. Petty =

American politician

Nathan D. Petty (January 6, 1842 – December 31, 1917) was an American lawyer, politician, and judge from New York.

== Life ==
Petty was born on January 6, 1842, in Good Ground, New York, the only surviving child of Charles Petty and Harriet Dickerson.

Petty grew up on his father's farm and attended the district school. He then went to a select school in Cutchogue, followed by a private school in Riverhead. In 1857, he went to the Sanborton Bridge Seminary in New Hampshire. After a year there, he went to the Fort Edward Institute in New York, followed by a year at Eastman's Commercial College in Poughkeepsie. In 1861, he entered Princeton College, graduating from there with an A.B. in 1865. In 1864, he took a leave of absence from Princeton to stump for Abraham Lincoln in New York and New Jersey. After graduating from Princeton with high honors, he went to Albany Law School and graduated from there a year later with an LL.B. He then began practicing law in Good Ground. In 1868, he moved to Riverhead and practiced law there.

In 1869, Petty was appointed Assistant Assessor of Internal Revenue for Suffolk County. He held that office until it was abolished in 1873. Later that year, he was elected to the New York State Assembly as a Republican, representing Suffolk County. He served in the Assembly in 1874 and 1875. While in the Assembly, he opposed the act to dissolve the Narrowsburgh Home Association (which passed the Assembly but failed in the Senate), supported submitting the Proposed Amendment to Article Five of the Constitution to the people (which was defeated in the Assembly), spoke against an act related to County Treasurers on the grounds some of the provisions were unconstitutional (which passed the House, with the Senate striking down the provisions), stood strongly in favor of Compulsory Education (which passed the Assembly by a large majority), and gave the nominating speech for Addison A. Keyes of Albany as Superintendent of Public Instruction. He also supported other bills that effected only Suffolk County.

Petty served as Chairman of the Republican County Committee for twelve consecutive years. In 1878, he was elected District Attorney of Suffolk County. He was re-elected to the office in 1881. In 1891, he was elected Judge of the Surrogate Court, an office he was re-elected to in 1897. After he finished serving as Surrogate, he returned to his law practice and continued working until moments before his death.

Petty was an official of the Congregational Church and a member of the Freemasons. In 1865, he married Cornelia Raimon of Newtown. Their children were Charles W., Nathan O., and Raimon.

Petty died from a brain hemorrhage shortly after returning home from his office on December 31, 1917. He was buried in Riverhead Cemetery.

New York State Assembly
Preceded by John S. Marcy	New York State Assembly; Suffolk County; 1874–1875	Succeeded by Samuel B. Gardiner
