= William Farquhar Payson =

William Farquhar Payson (18 February 1876 – April 15, 1939) was an American author and editor.

== Early life ==
He was born in New York City on February 18, 1876. He was a son of Francis and Mary F. (née Dabney) Payson. Among his siblings was Mary Dabney Payson (the wife of banker Stephen Baker, the president of the Bank of the Manhattan Company and a son of U.S. Representative Stephen Baker).

He was a grandson of John Larkin and Frances (née Lithgow) Payson, and of Charles Henry and Ellen M. (née Jones) Dabney, and a descendant of Edward Payson (1614–1675). He received his preparatory education in England and in New York city; was a student at Columbia University from 1892 to 1893.

== Career ==
In 1893 engaged in journalism. From 1893 to 1895, he was on the editorial staff of the New York Times, and managing editor of Vogue from 1895 to 1897, after which he made his home in Bristol, Rhode Island, and gave his attention to literary work.

From 1909 to 1913, he was a vice president and literary advisor for the Sturgis & Walton Company, Publishers. In 1924, he helped found Payson & Clarke, Ltd., Publishers, and served as the firm's president for the next four years.

== Personal life ==
On October 27, 1897, he was married to Mary Farquhar Jones King (1868–1955), a daughter of Charles Goodrich King of Providence, Rhode Island. In 1927 he married Clara Moores, a former actress.

After an illness of three years, Payson died on April 15, 1939, at 19 East 98th Street, his residence in Manhattan. He was buried at the Acacia Memorial Park in Lake Forest Park, Washington.

== Published works ==
- The Copymaker, 1897
- The Title-Mongers, 1898
- John Vytal; a Tale of the Lost Colony, 1901
- The Triumph of Life, 1903
- Debonnaire, 1904
- Barry Gordon, 1908
- Periwinkle; an Idyl of the Dunes, 1910
- Love Letters of a Divorced Couple, 1915
- Give Me Tomorrow, 1935
