= Clara Moores =

American actress

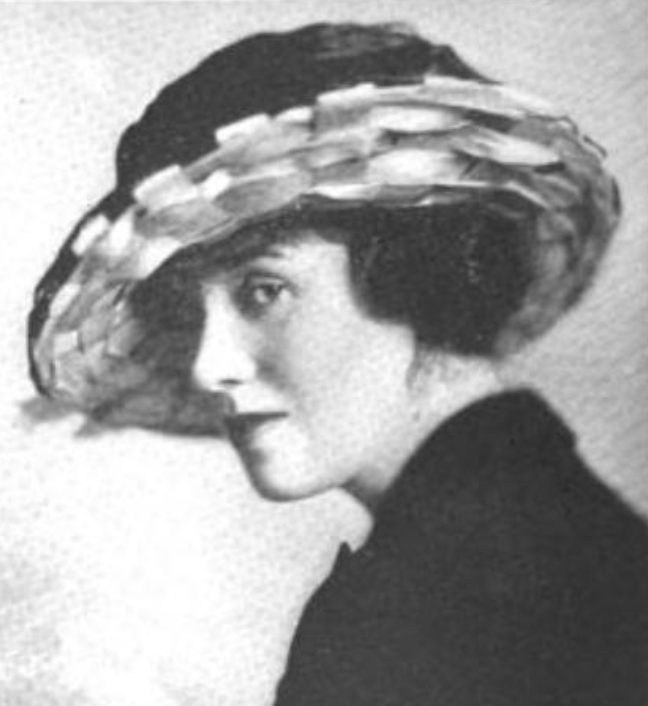
- Clara Moores, from a 1920 publication; she is wearing a hat made from wood shavings, as publicity for a show called Shavings
- Born: Clara Louise Munchhoff; July 27, 1896; Omaha, Nebraska
- Died: January 21, 1986 (aged 89); Seattle, Washington
- Other names: Clare Moores, Clara Payson
- Occupation: Actress
- Spouse: William Farquhar Payson

Clara Moores Payson (July 27, 1896 – January 21, 1986), born Clara Munchhoff, was an American stage actress.

== Early life ==
Clara Louise Munchhoff was born in Omaha, Nebraska in 1898, the daughter of Joseph W. Munchhoff and Mate (or May Etta) Cannon Munchhoff. Her father owned a traveling carnival. Her mother was active in the suffrage movement and her (step) grandfather, Frank E. Moores, was a controversial Mayor of Omaha. She adopted the surname of her stepfather, railwayman Harry E. Moores, after her mother remarried in 1909. She was raised in Seattle, and graduated from Broadway High School and attended the University of Washington.

== Career ==
Moores acted on the stage, beginning in college, and later mainly in Boston and on Broadway, with stage credits including roles in Madame X, Under Cover, A Cure for Curables (1918), His Majesty Bunker Bean, Dangerous Years, Lilies of the Field, Shavings (1920), Pot Luck (1921), Common Clay, Cobra (1924) and The Circle.

Moores was considered a stylish beauty in her time. The costumes she wore on stage were described in detail. As publicity for Shavings, she was photographed in hats made from wood shavings. In 1920, she wrote a beauty advice column on attractive arms, for newspaper syndication.

During World War II, Moores (by then named Payson) organized vaudeville-style entertainments for enlisted men stationed in the Seattle area.

== Personal life ==
Moores became the second wife of writer, editor, and publisher William Farquhar Payson in 1927. Her husband died in 1939; she died in Seattle in 1986, aged 89 years.
