= John Thompson (1809–1890) =

American politician

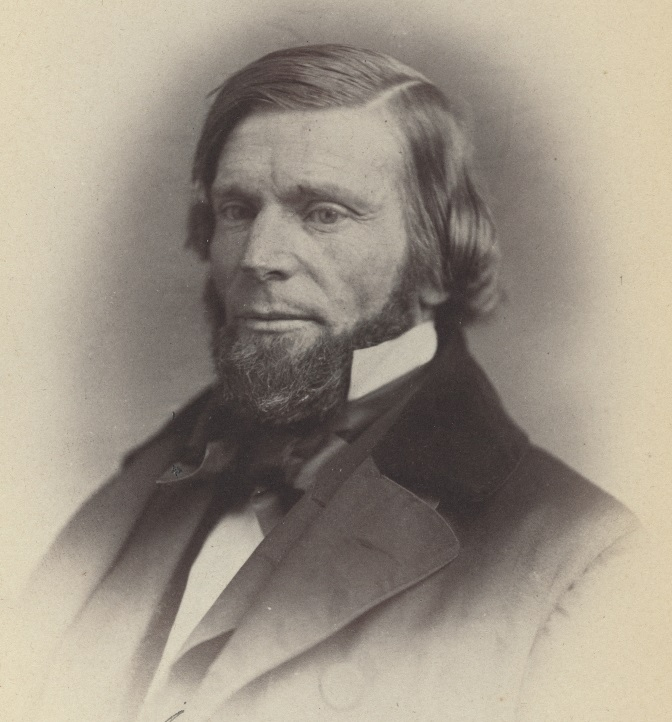
- Thompson in 1859

Member of the U.S. House of Representatives from New York's 12th district
- In office March 4, 1857 – March 3, 1859
- Preceded by: Killian Miller
- Succeeded by: Charles Lewis Beale

Personal details
- Born: July 4, 1809 Rhinebeck, New York
- Died: June 1, 1890 (aged 80) New Hamburg, New York

John Thompson (July 4, 1809 – June 1, 1890) was an American politician and lawyer who was a U.S. representative from New York from 1857 to 1859.

== Biography ==
Thompson was Born in Rhinebeck, New York. He studied law, was admitted to the bar and commenced practice in Poughkeepsie, New York.

He was elected as a Republican to the Thirty-fifth Congress, serving from March 4, 1857 to March 3, 1859. He did not run for reelection in 1858, and resumed the practice of law.

Thompson was one of the first trustees of Vassar College, and served from 1861 to 1885. He was also president of the Falkill National Bank. He received honorary Master of Arts degrees from Union College in Schenectady, New York and Yale College.

He died in New Hamburg, New York on June 1, 1890. He was interred in Poughkeepsie Rural Cemetery.

== Sources ==
U.S. House of Representatives
Preceded by Killian Miller	Representative of the 12th Congressional District of New York; March 4, 1857 – March 3, 1859	Succeeded by Charles Lewis Beale
