= Roger Milliken =

American textile executive (1915–2010)

- Roger Milliken
- Born: October 24, 1915; New York City, New York, U.S.
- Died: December 30, 2010 (aged 95); Spartanburg, South Carolina, U.S.
- Occupations: Textile heir, industrialist, businessman, and political activist
- Spouse: Justine van Rensselaer Hooper
- Children: Roger Jr., Justine, Nancy, David, Weston
- Parent(s): Gerrish Milliken and Agnes Gayley

Roger Milliken (October 24, 1915 – December 30, 2010) was an American textile heir, industrialist, businessman, and political activist. He was president and then CEO of his family's company, Milliken & Company, from 1947 until 2005. He continued as chairman until his death in 2010. Milliken is known as a political godfather to the American conservative movement.

== Company background ==
Deering Milliken Company was co-founded by Roger's grandfather, Seth Minot Milliken, and William Deering in 1865. The small woolens fabric company was initially based in Portland, Maine, but moved to New York City in 1868 after William Deering left Deering Milliken to start the Deering Harvester company. Deering Harvester later merged with the McCormick Harvester Company to form International Harvester. There is a surviving spinoff of International Harvester (which is today known as Navistar International). In 1884, Deering Milliken Company invested in its first property near Spartanburg, South Carolina, where the company's headquarters have been based since 1958. In 1976, Deering Milliken officially became Milliken & Company.

== Personal life ==
Milliken was born October 24, 1915, in New York City, the eldest son of Gerrish Hill Milliken and Agnes Malcolm (née Gayley) Milliken. Roger's grandfather was Seth Milliken, co-founder of what is today known as Milliken & Company. He attended Yale University, where he studied French history and graduated in 1937. After graduation, he started out in New York City’s Mercantile Stores, in which his family had an ownership stake. Roger's brother Gerrish H. Milliken was married to Phoebe Thayer Milliken née Goodhue, the daughter of the banker F. Abott Goodhue.

In 1941, he was given the stewardship of three small woolen-producing mills in Maine. When his father, Gerrish, died in 1947, the 32-year-old Milliken succeeded him as president. Young Roger Milliken soon became embroiled in one of the ugliest labor disputes in American history. In 1956 Roger Milliken imposed changes in working conditions at the Darlington SC textile mill that were unfavorable to the workers. The workers at the mill — which had been in operation 1883 — felt they were suddenly being treated like slaves. In response the workers voted to negotiate with their employer which was their absolute right under United States labor law. Roger Milliken responded by firing all the workers in violation of federal labor law and closing the mill. The former employees sued to enforce the law. The United States Supreme Court ruled against Milliken in 1965. After delaying 15 more years, in 1980 Milliken and Company settled the matter by paying $5 million to the 439 Darlington workers who were still alive and the heirs of the 114 workers that had died without being paid.

Roger Milliken died on December 30, 2010. Funeral services were held at Church of the Advent and he was buried at Greenlawn Memorial Gardens of Spartanburg.

== Family ==
Milliken met his future wife, Justine van Rensselaer Hooper, at a dinner party. They married in 1948 and had five children. Justine died in 2003.

Milliken's son Weston is an openly gay man, liberal activist, and member of the Democracy Alliance that is dedicated to advancing the rights of organized labor, people of color, women, and LGBT people in Southern states. Weston's activism has been described as "clearly avenging the sins of the father."

Among Milliken's other living relatives is Cody Franchetti, an independent scholar in Rome.

== Activism ==
The Milliken family was active in the community, Roger serving on the board of Wofford College and Justine on the board of Converse College. Milliken also served on other corporate and nonprofit boards, including Arthur D. Little, Westinghouse, Citicorp, Mercantile, W.R. Grace, Institute of Textile Technology, The Heritage Foundation, the Greenville-Spartanburg Airport Commission, and the Spartanburg Day School.

Milliken was vehemently Anti-Union, closing the Darlington Manufacturing Company after workers there voted to unionize in 1956.

== Politics ==
He was president of Milliken & Company until 1983, when he became chairman and CEO. He relinquished the CEO title in 2005, and remained chairman until his death. Starting in the 1950s, Milliken helped build the South Carolina Republican Party, which had been in the minority for decades. Milliken helped convince South Carolina Senator Strom Thurmond to switch to the Republican Party.

Milliken raised the money for the "Senator Thurmond Speaks for Nixon-Agnew" commercials that formed part of Nixon's Southern Strategy of attracting white Southerners to the Republican Party in the 1968 Presidential election. He was a notable donor to conservative causes. He supported National Review, the Western Goals Foundation, the John Birch Society, Barry Goldwater, Ronald Reagan, and Pat Buchanan, among others.
