= Francis Brill =

American farmer and politician (1836–1913)

Francis Brill (October 1, 1836 – March 25, 1913) was an American farmer and politician from New York.

== Life ==
Brill was born on October 1, 1836 in Jersey City, New Jersey, the son of John Brill.

Brill attended Anthon's Grammar School of Columbia College in New York City as well as the academy in Newark. He was drafted during the American Civil War but sent a substitute. He served as School Commissioner of Newark's 12th ward from 1861 to 1862. He later moved to Mattituck, New York. A seed grower and farmer, he wrote an agricultural work called "Farm Gardening and Seed Growing." In 1876, he was elected to the New York State Assembly as a Democrat, representing Suffolk County. He served in the Assembly in 1877.

Brill moved to Riverhead in 1881, followed by Hempstead in 1886. He had a seed farm in Mattituck and had a national reputation for his specialty of cauliflower and cabbage. He had his headquarters in Riverhead until he moved to Hempstead, where he established a wholesale seed business. He also served as town clerk of Hempstead for three years.

In 1857, Brill married Ann E. McDonald. Their children were A. Walter, Mrs. John S. Nichols, Mrs. Louis F. Huleu, Libbie, and Mrs. Walter Badger.

Brill died at the Hempstead Sanitorium from intestinal trouble on March 25, 1913.

New York State Assembly
Preceded by Samuel B. Gardiner	New York State Assembly; Suffolk County; 1877	Succeeded by Charles S. Havens
