= Charles Lewis Beale =

American politician

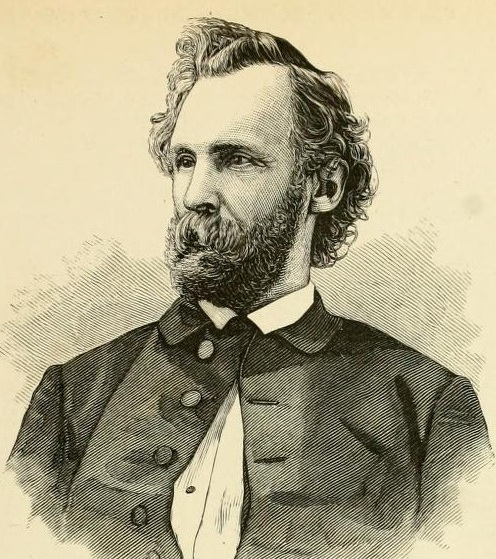

Member of the U.S. House of Representatives from New York's 12th district
- In office March 4, 1859 – March 3, 1861
- Preceded by: John Thompson
- Succeeded by: Stephen Baker

Personal details
- Born: March 5, 1824 Canaan, New York
- Died: January 30, 1899 (aged 74) Hudson, New York
- Citizenship: United States
- Party: Republican
- Spouse: Catharine Wilder Baldwin Beale (Married 1855)
- Children: Charles F. T. Beale; Eloise Beale; Jessie Beale Bond
- Education: Union College
- Profession: Lawyer; Politician

Charles Lewis Beale (March 5, 1824 – January 30, 1899) was an American politician and a member of the United States House of Representatives from New York.

== Biography ==
Born in Canaan, New York, Beale graduated from Union College, Schenectady, New York, in 1844, where he had been a member of the Kappa Alpha Society. He studied law, and was admitted to the bar in 1849.

== Career ==
Beale commenced practice in Kinderhook, New York in 1851 and continued the practice of law in Hudson, New York from 1866 to 1890.

Elected as a Republican to the Thirty-sixth Congress, Beale was a U. S. Representative for the twelfth congressional district of New York from March 4, 1859 to March 3, 1861). He was an unsuccessful candidate for reelection in 1860 to the following congress. He was a presidential elector in 1864. Afterwards, he became a delegate to the Union National Convention at Philadelphia in 1866 then resumed his law practice.

== Death ==
Beale died in Hudson, Columbia County, New York, on January 30, 1899. He is interred at Kinderhook Cemetery, Kinderhook, New York.

U.S. House of Representatives
Preceded by John Thompson	Representative of the 12th Congressional District of New York; March 4, 1859 – March 3, 1861	Succeeded by Stephen Baker
