= Milliken & Company =

US diversified industrial manufacturer

- Company type: Private
- Traded as: N/A
- Industry: Innovation, Research, Chemistry, Floor Covering, Performance Materials and Textiles, Healthcare
- Founded: 1865
- Headquarters: Spartanburg, South Carolina, U.S.
- Area served: Worldwide
- Key people: Halsey Moon Cook Jr. (President, CEO)
- Products: Specialty Chemicals; Floor Coverings; Specialty Fabrics; Performance Products; Milliken Performance Solutions; Milliken Healthcare Products
- Revenue: Not Available to Public
- Operating income: Not Available to Public
- Net income: Not Available to Public
- Total assets: Not Available to Public
- Total equity: Not Available to Public
- Number of employees: 7,000 (2011)
- Website: Official website

Milliken & Company is an American industrial manufacturer that has been in business since 1865. With corporate headquarters located in Spartanburg, South Carolina, the company is active across a breadth of disciplines including specialty chemical, floor covering, performance and protective textile materials, and healthcare.

Milliken employs many scientists, including a large number with masters and doctoral degrees. Milliken has been granted more than 2,500 U.S. patents and more than 5,500 patents worldwide.

== History ==
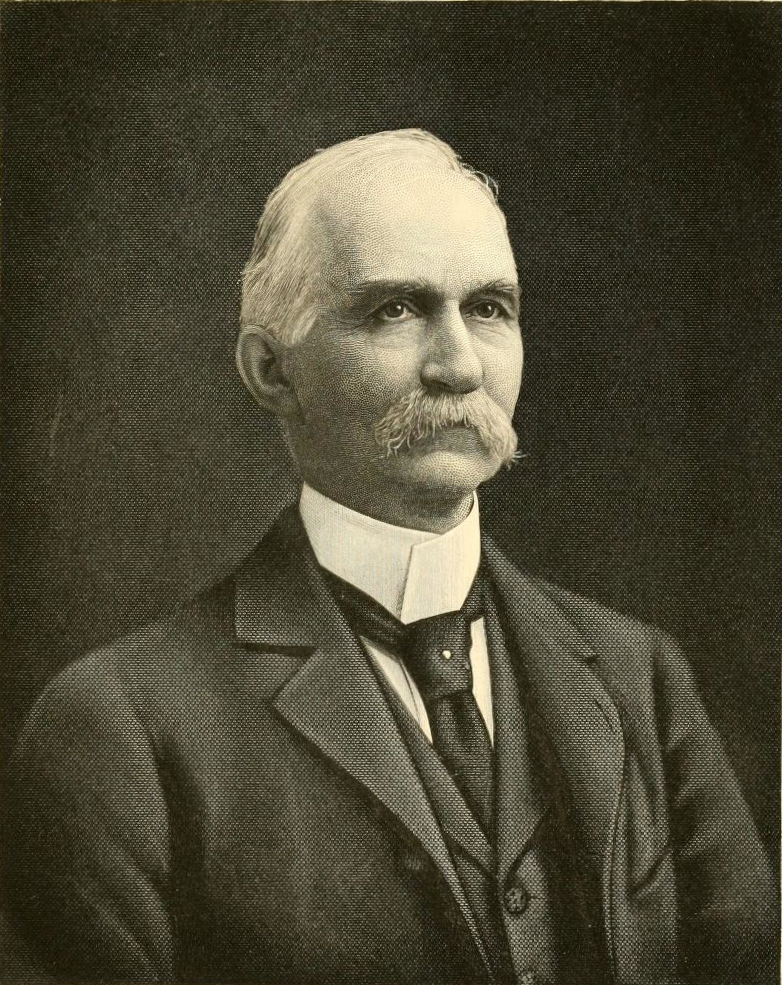
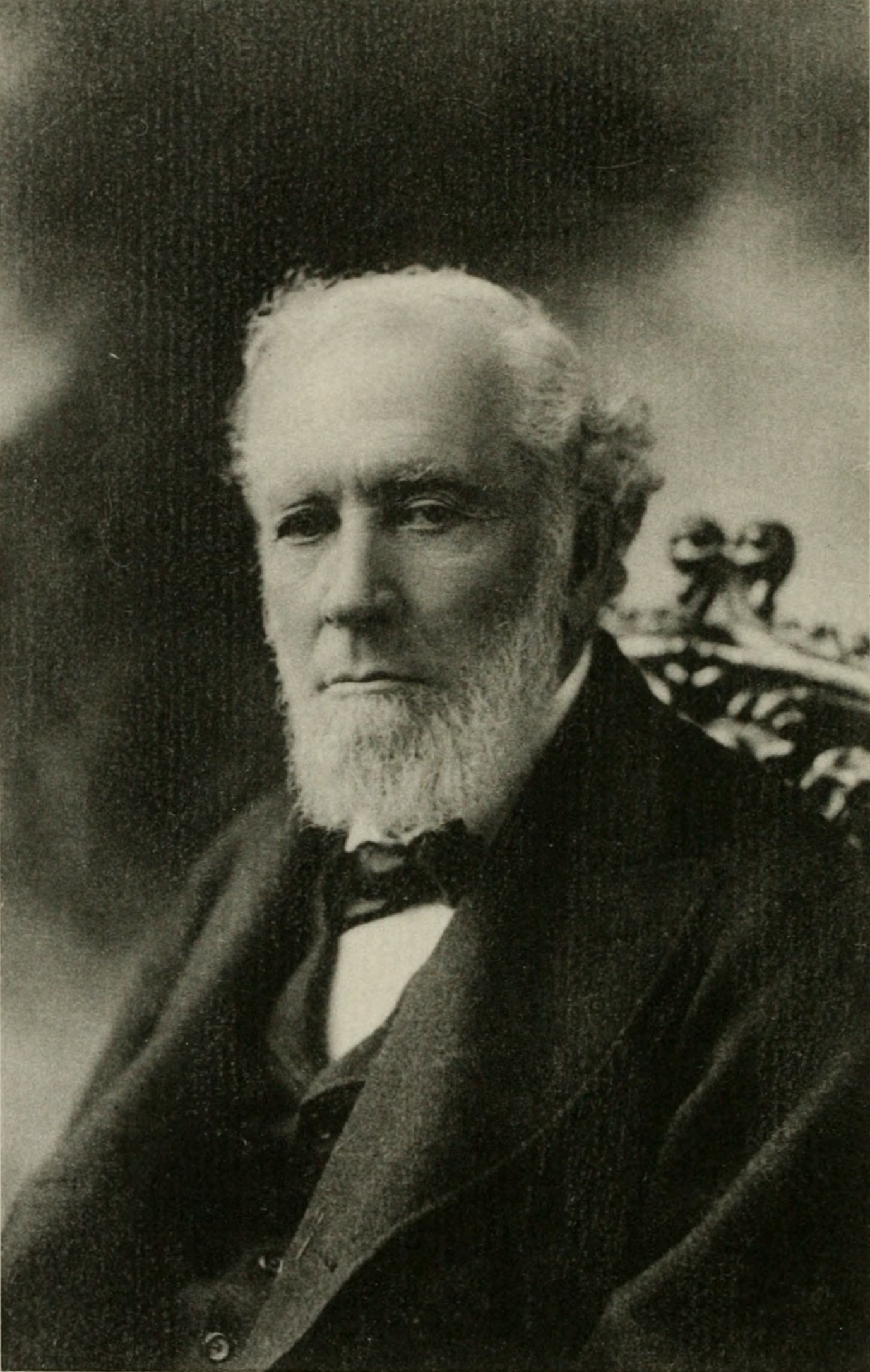
Seth M. Milliken and William Deering, founders of Milliken & Company

In 1865, Seth M. Milliken and William Deering founded Deering Milliken Company, a small woolen fabrics distributor in Portland, Maine. In 1868, Milliken moved the company headquarters to New York City, at that time the heart of the American textile industry. In 1884, the company invested in a new facility in Pacolet, South Carolina, and from that investment the manufacturing operations grew. Milliken & Company headquarters moved to Spartanburg, South Carolina in 1958 and included a dedicated research center on campus. Today, the company operates in a number of diverse disciplines, including specialty chemicals, performance and protective textiles, floor coverings, specialty fabrics, healthcare, and business consulting services. In 2018, Sage Automotive Interiors was carved out of Milliken & Company and became a separate entity.

From 1956 until 1980 Milliken & Company (then operating as Deering Milliken) was involved in one of the ugliest and most drawn-out affairs in the history of labor relations. In 1956 company president Roger Milliken closed the Darlington SC mill in response to the workers' vote to approve the Textile Workers Union of America to represent them after Milliken had imposed several changes to working conditions that were unfavorable to the workers. The case was argued all the way to the U.S. Supreme Court which ruled against Milliken in 1965. In 1980 after 15 more years of delay Milliken & Company paid $5 million to the 439 Darlington workers who were still alive and the families of the 114 workers who died without getting paid.

In the 1980s the company grew to a peak of 25,000 employees. As the nation embraced free trade Milliken could not compete with lower cost imported goods and most of their mills were closed or sold, and the company downsized to 7,000 employees. The company acquired several small businesses in healthcare and specialty chemicals to diversify away from traditional textile manufacturing.

== Company leadership ==
Roger Milliken became president of the company on the death of his father in 1947 and served in that capacity until 1983, when he became chairman and chief executive officer of Milliken & Company, naming Dr. Thomas J. Malone as president and chief operating officer. In 2002, Malone retired, and Dr. Ashley Allen was named president and COO, becoming CEO in 2006 as Milliken stepped aside from daily management. In 2008, Allen retired and was succeeded by Dr. Joe Salley. In October 2016, J. Harold Chandler, who has served on Milliken's board for over a decade, was appointed as chairman, and interim president and chief executive officer. On July 11, 2018, it was announced that Halsey Moon Cook Jr. will take the helm as Milliken's next President and CEO, Effective September 1, 2018. Harold Chandler will continue in his role as chairman of the board.

== Most Ethical Company claim ==
As of February 2020, Milliken & Company celebrated 14 years as one of the "World's Most Ethical Companies", according to the Ethisphere Institute which describes itself as "a global leader in defining and advancing the standards of ethical business practices". However, the Ethisphere Institute has been criticized by the Los Angeles Times for accepting money from the companies they rate. The integrity of the rating methodology used by the Ethisphere Institute was called into question by an article in Slate magazine.

== Manufacturing base ==
Milliken & Company has more than 7,000 associates and operated over 40 manufacturing facilities in the United States, United Kingdom, Belgium, France, Germany, Mexico and China. Milliken serves a variety of industries including healthcare, transportation, building and infrastructure, hospitality, industrial manufacturing, architecture and design, and specialty chemicals.

== Industrial musicals ==
From 1956 to 1980, Milliken sponsored an annual company musical, the Milliken Breakfast Show, at the Waldorf-Astoria for its buyers to launch the new season. Stars who appeared in these productions included Gloria Swanson, Ginger Rogers, Rene Auberjonois, Dom DeLuise, Bert Lahr, Ann Miller, Gwen Verdon, Dorothy Loudon, Sarah Jessica Parker, Chita Rivera, Donald O'Connor, Juliet Prowse, and Tommy Tune. The cost of these productions could exceed the cost of a public Broadway show. For example, the 1970 production on the lighter side of garment manufacturing life, directed by Peter Howard, cost nearly $1 million for 13 performances, with an audience of approximately 25,000 Milliken buyers. No recordings of these musicals are known to exist.

== Advertising ==
The company produced ads in the 1970s until the 1990s with Barbara Mandrell featuring the company's chemically treated fabrics under the name Visa "America's freedom fabric" as was the slogan.
