= Jonathan Thompson (collector) =

American merchant, banker and politician

Collector of the Port of New York
- In office 1820–1829
- President: James Monroe; John Quincy Adams
- Preceded by: David Gelston
- Succeeded by: Samuel Swartwout

Personal details
- Born: December 7, 1773 Islip, Suffolk County, New York, U.S.
- Died: December 30, 1846 (aged 73) New York City, New York, U.S.
- Party: Democratic-Republican
- Spouse: Elizabeth Havens (after 1796)
- Children: 7, including David

Jonathan Thompson (December 7, 1773 – December 30, 1846) was an American merchant, banker and politician.

== Early life ==
Thompson was born on December 7, 1773, at Sagtikos Manor in Islip. He was the son of Isaac Thompson (1743–1816), judge of the Suffolk Court of Common Pleas, and member of the New York State Assembly in 1795, and Mary (née Gardiner) Thompson (d. 1786), who wed in 1772. His brother was Abraham Gardiner Thompson.

His paternal grandparents were Mary (née Woodhull) Thompson (a first cousin of Gen. Nathaniel Woodhull) and Jonathan Thompson, a Justice of the Peace for forty years. His maternal grandfather was Col. Abraham Gardiner of East Hampton, New York, son of the lord of the manor of Gardiners Island (descendants of Lion Gardiner).

== Career ==
Along with his brother and Nathaniel Gardiner, he became a partner in Gardiner & Thompson, a New York City import firm trading in the West Indies. From 1813 on, he was a director of the Bank of the Manhattan Company.

The first peak of the transatlantic company "Black Ball Line" began in 1820 with packet-ships voyages as per schedule. The company was founded by Jeremia Thompson, Francis Thompson and others and one packet-sailing ships of the "Black Ball Line" had name "James Monroe" , - named in honor of President James Monroe.

From March 1840 until his death, he was President of the Bank of the Manhattan Company.

=== Political career ===
For ten consecutive years, he was the chairman of the Democratic-Republican general committee.

In 1813, he was appointed collector of direct taxes and duties by President James Madison until that role was abolished in 1819. In 1820, President James Monroe appointed Jonathan Thompson Collector of the Port of New York. He held this office until 1829, when he was removed by President Andrew Jackson and replaced by Samuel Swartwout (later known for his role in the Swartwout-Hoyt scandal).

== Personal life ==
On June 4, 1796, he was married Elizabeth Havens (1773–1868), daughter of James Havens of Shelter Island. Together, they were the parents of seven children, including:

- David Thompson (1798–1871), who served as President of the New York Life Insurance and Trust Company who married Sarah Diodati Gardiner, a daughter of John Lion Gardiner, 7th Lord of the Manor of Gardiner's Island.
- Junius Thompson, who died young.
- George W. Thompson (1805–1884), who married Eliza Ann Prall.
- Mary Gardiner Thompson (1807–1887), who married Hon. Samuel B. Gardiner (1815–1882), 10th Lord of the Manor of Gardiner's Island and a son of John Lion Gardiner, in 1837.
- Elizabeth Thompson, who married Alonzo Brown, Esq.
- Dr. Abraham Gardiner Thompson (b. 1816).

Thompson died in New York City on December 30, 1846.

=== Descendants ===
Through his daughter Mary, he was the grandfather of Sarah Griswold Gardiner (1848–1927), who married John Alexander Tyler (1848–1883), second son of President John Tyler and his second wife, Julia Gardiner Tyler.

== Sources ==
Government offices
Preceded by David Gelston	Collector of the Port of New York; 1820–1829	Succeeded by Samuel Swartwout
