= Merchants' National Bank of New York =

American bank (1820–1903)

The Merchants' National Bank of New York
- Company type: Public
- Industry: Banking
- Founded: April 7, 1803
- Defunct: 1920
- Fate: Merged with Bank of the Manhattan Company
- Successor: JPMorgan Chase
- Headquarters: 42 Wall Street, New York City, New York, United States
- Area served: New York
- Key people: Oliver Wolcott Jr., Joshua Sands, Richard Varick
- Products: Financial services

The Merchants' National Bank of the City of New York was an American bank based in New York City.

== History ==
On April 7, 1803, fourteen men met at 25 Wall Street to sign the Articles of Association of the Merchants' Bank in the City of New York. The document was drawn up by Alexander Hamilton, a former U.S. Secretary of the Treasury.

In 1803, a total of 24,925 shares, at $50 per share, were owned by investors, totaling $1,246,250 (equivalent to $26,794,000 in 2025). Elbert Adrian Brinckerhoff, son-in-law of W. R. Vermilye (former president of the New York Stock Exchange and brother of Merchants' Bank president Jacob D. Vermilye) was long associated with Merchants' Bank. At its establishment, the bank occupied 42 Wall Street, next door to the Manhattan Company and its bank.

In 1839, bank leaders constructed a new building on the site. They replaced that building with yet another, the Merchants' National Bank building, built from 1883 to 1886.

From 1894 to 1901, the bank employed as a cashier Joseph Wright Harriman, who would later found Harriman National Bank and Trust Company and serve nearly five years in prison for bank fraud.

In 1920, the bank was called The Merchants' National Bank of the City of New York and had capital stock of $3,000,000, consisting of 30,000 shares at par value of $100, all listed upon the New York Stock Exchange.

=== Merger ===
In 1920, the Merchants bank merged with the Bank of the Manhattan Company. Established in 1799 by Aaron Burr, the Manhattan Company bank is the oldest of the predecessor institutions of today's JPMorgan Chase & Co. On March 1, 1920, three things happened: Merchants was converted from a national bank into a state bank under the name of The Merchants' Bank of the City of New York; the merger agreement was signed; and the deal was approved by the Superintendent of Banks. The merger became effective on March 27, and Merchants president Raymond E. Jones became vice president and second-in-command of the combined institutions.

In 1929, the Merchants Bank building was demolished to make way for the merged banks' combined headquarters at 40 Wall Street.

== List of presidents ==
- Oliver Wolcott (1803–1804)
- Joshua Sands (1804–1808)
- Richard Varick (1808–1820)
- Lynde Catlin (1820–1833)
- John I. Palmer (1833–1858)
- Augustus Ely Silliman (1858–1868)
- Jacob Dyckman Vermilye (1868–1892)
- Robert M. Gallaway (1892–1917)
- Theodore E. Burton (1917–1919)
- Raymond E. Jones (1919–1920)
