= Charles William Taussig =

American writer and manufacturer

Charles William Taussig (born August 9, 1896 – May 10, 1948) was an American writer and manufacturer. He was President of American Molasses Company (Grandma's Molasses, since 2006 owned by B&G Foods) and early Brain Trust advisor to Franklin Delano Roosevelt.

Taussig also attended the founding of the United Nations (April–June 1945) as a member of the US delegation.
