= David Thompson (American businessman, born 1798) =

American businessman

David Thompson (1798 – February 1871) was an American businessman. He was President of the New York Life Insurance and Trust Company.

== Life ==
He was the son of Jonathan Thompson who was Collector of the Port of New York during the administrations of Presidents James Monroe and John Quincy Adams. He married Sarah Diodate Gardiner (ca. 1808-1891), and they had seven children.

Thompson entered the office of his father after completing his education with a concentration in the English language, French language, and the Classics. Two years later he became Cashier of the United States Customs House in New York City. Prior to obtaining the presidency of New York Life Insurance, he served successively as Cashier of the Fulton Bank and Cashier of the Bank of America.

== Sources ==
- The History of Long Island by Benjamin Franklin Thompson
- "Obituary, David Thompson", The New York Times, February 24, 1871, pg. 4
- His wife's death notice in NYT on March 9, 1891
