= Paul Warburg =

German born American banker (1868–1932)

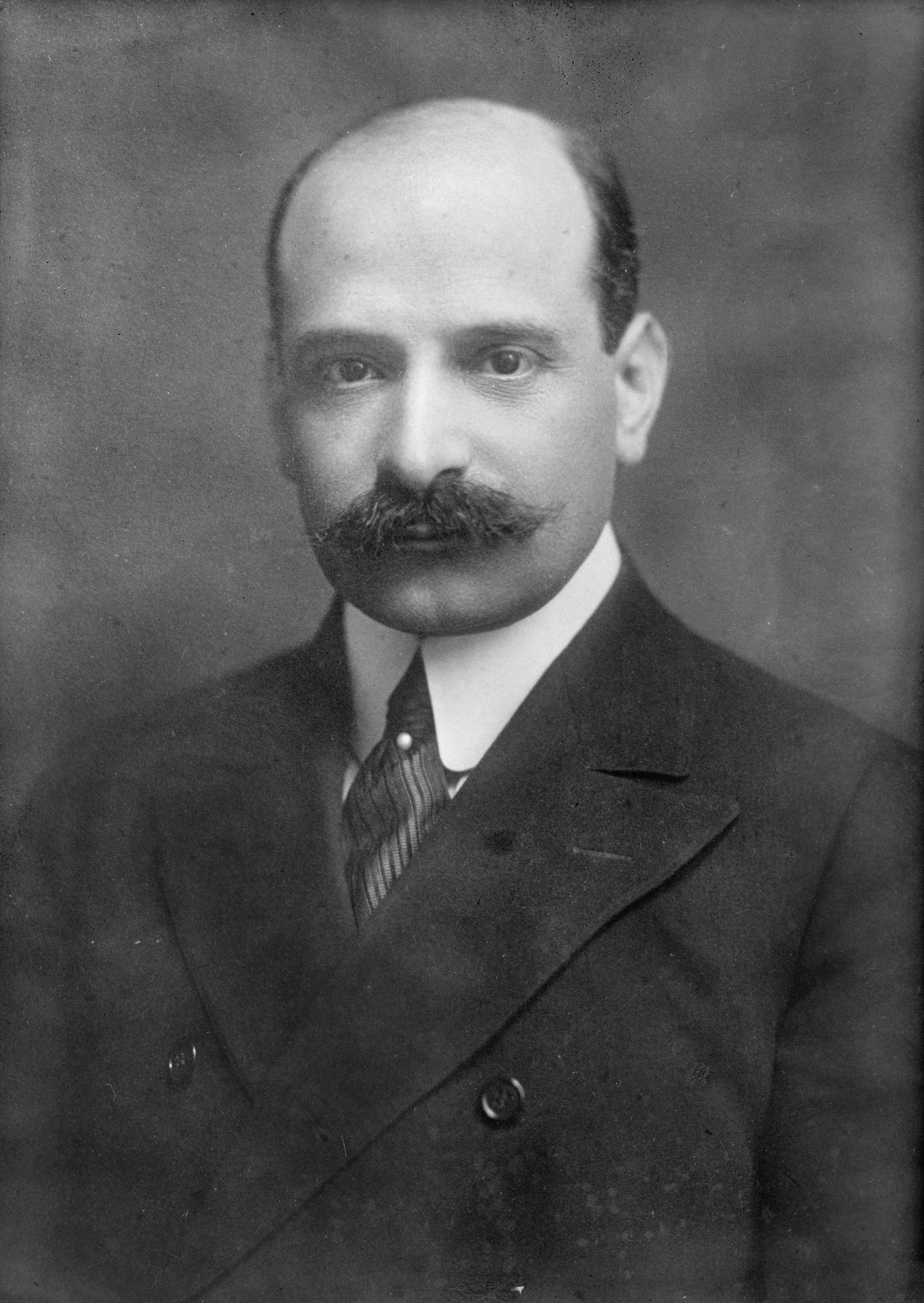
- Warburg c. 1910s

2nd Vice Chairman of the Federal Reserve
- In office August 10, 1916 – August 9, 1918
- President: Woodrow Wilson
- Preceded by: Frederic Adrian Delano
- Succeeded by: Albert Strauss

Member of the Federal Reserve Board
- In office August 10, 1914 – August 9, 1918
- President: Woodrow Wilson
- Preceded by: Position established
- Succeeded by: Albert Strauss

Personal details
- Born: Paul Moritz Warburg; August 10, 1868 Hamburg, Germany
- Died: January 24, 1932 (aged 63) New York City, U.S.
- Party: Democratic

Paul Moritz Warburg (August 10, 1868 – January 24, 1932) was a German-born American investment banker who served as the second vice chairman of the Federal Reserve from 1916 to 1918. Prior to his term as vice chairman, Warburg served as one of the original members of the Federal Reserve Board, taking office in 1914. He was an early advocate for the establishment of the U.S. central banking system.

== Early life ==
Warburg was born in Hamburg, Germany, to the Warburg family, a German Jewish banking dynasty with origins in Venice. His parents were Moritz and Charlotte Esther (Oppenheim) Warburg. After graduating from the Realgymnasium in Hamburg in 1886, he entered the employ of Simon Hauer, a Hamburg importer and exporter, to learn the fundamentals of business practice. He similarly worked for Samuel Montagu & Co., bankers, in London in 1889–1890, and the Banque Russe pour le Commerce Etranger in Paris in 1890–1891.

In 1891, Warburg entered the office of the family banking firm of M. M. Warburg & Co., which had been founded in 1798 by his great-grandfather. He interrupted work there to undertake a world tour during the winter of 1891–1892. Warburg was admitted to a partnership in the family firm in 1895.

On October 1, 1895, Warburg was married in New York City to Nina J. Loeb, daughter of Solomon Loeb, a founder of the New York investment firm of Kuhn, Loeb & Co. The Warburgs were the parents of a son, James Paul Warburg, and a daughter, Bettina Warburg Grimson.

== Career ==
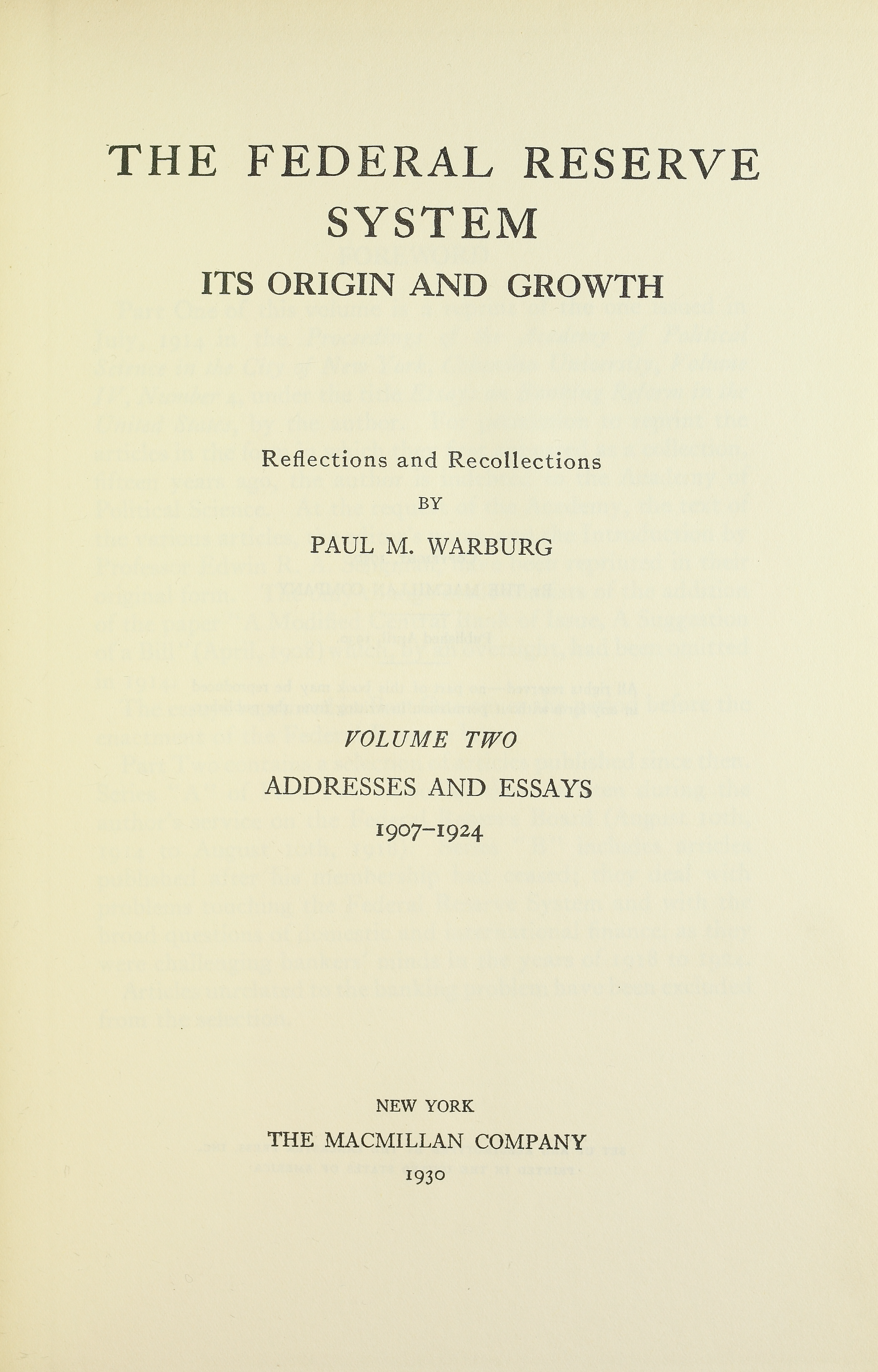
Paul Moritz Warburg, Addresses and essays, 1930

Although a major factor in German finance, after frequent business trips to New York Warburg settled there in 1902 as a partner in Kuhn, Loeb & Co., where the influential Jacob Schiff was senior partner. Paul's brother, Felix, was married to Schiff's daughter and both brothers would be involved with Kuhn, Loeb over the years, making partner after marrying into the firms family members. Warburg remained a partner in the family firm in Hamburg, but he became a naturalized American citizen in 1911. He was a member of Temple Emanu-El in New York City.

Warburg was elected a director of Wells Fargo & Company in February 1910. He resigned in September 1914 following his appointment to the Federal Reserve Board, and Jacob Schiff was elected to his seat on the Wells Fargo board.

Warburg became known as a persuasive advocate of central banking in America. Many of his contemporaries regarded him as the chief driving force behind the establishment of America's central bank. Russell Leffingwell, who served variously as the Assistant Secretary of the Treasury, head of the Council on Foreign Relations, and chairman of J.P. Morgan, credited Warburg with doing "yeoman's service in preaching the doctrines and practices of modern [central] European banking" while all other "friends of sound money" were so occupied with battling against the free silver movement that they gave scant thought to the need for currency reform. Harold Kellock of The Century Magazine, characterized Warburg as "the mildest-mannered man that ever personally conducted a revolution." This shy and sensitive man, Kellock continued, "imposed his idea on a nation of a hundred million people."

Upon arriving in New York in 1902, Warburg drafted a critique of the American banking system, which he thought was insufficiently centralized. Self-conscious of his imperfect English and his status as a newcomer, he left his paper to sit in his desk for four years. He overcame his reticence in 1906 after attending a dinner party hosted by Professor Edwin Seligman of Columbia University. Seligman, an advocate of central banking, was impressed with Warburg's extensive knowledge of the financial system and reportedly told him that "It's your duty to get your ideas before the country."

Shortly thereafter, the New York Times published Warburg's "Defects and Needs of our Banking System". Concerning its financial system, he argued, "The United States is in fact at about the same point that had been reached by Europe at the time of the Medicis, and by Asia, in all likelihood, at the time of Hammurabi." The chief reason for this lagging state of development was the lack of a central institution that could rediscount bank promissory notes to facilitate the exchange of promises of future payment for cash. A central bank constructed along the lines of the Reichsbank could fulfill this role, according to Warburg, and thus make it easier for the excess reserves of one bank to be used to bolster the insufficient reserves of another.

Warburg's ideas gained a wider hearing after the panic of 1907 engulfed the country's financial system, and he subsequently published two more articles elaborating and defending his plans, "A Plan for a Modified Central Bank" and "A United Reserve Bank of the United States". At the same time, he appeared at conferences hosted by Columbia University, the American Economic Society, and the Academy of Political Science.

By 1908, Warburg had gained enough recognition that Nelson Aldrich, the Republican senator from Rhode Island, consulted him for advice on currency reform. The National Monetary Commission, which Aldrich chaired, subsequently interviewed Warburg on multiple occasions. In 1910, Aldrich invited Warburg to attend a secret meeting with other influential bankers on Jekyll Island in Georgia, where the draft of a bill to establish a central bank was worked out. This bill was close enough to the outline that he adumbrated in his three articles that Harold Kellock could write, "Five years from the time Mr. Warburg had begun his single-handed crusade, his ideas were placed before Congress in the form of the Aldrich Bill."

The Aldrich Bill, however, did not become the Federal Reserve Act. The Owen–Glass Bill did. But modern scholars such as Elmus Wicker, Murray Rothbard, William Greider, and Griffin believe that the Aldrich and Owen–Glass bills are so similar that there is little doubt the latter plan was heavily influenced by the former. "The New York bankers got all they wanted", Wicker argues, "with the single exception of banker control. ... The Federal Reserve Act owes as much, if not more, to Senator Aldrich as it does to Representative Glass." Despite some minor quibbles, Warburg himself largely celebrated the Owen–Glass Bill in the North American Review. It was "a source of great satisfaction", he wrote, that both the Democratic and Republican parties had come to embrace the type of plan for which reformers like him had been campaigning.

In 1919, he founded and became first chairman of the American Acceptance Council. He organized and became the first chairman of the International Acceptance Bank of New York in 1921. International Acceptance was acquired by the Bank of the Manhattan Company in 1929, with Warburg becoming chairman of the combined organization.

He became a director of the Council on Foreign Relations at its founding in 1921, remaining on the board until his death. From 1921 to 1926 Warburg was a member of the advisory council of Federal Reserve Board, serving as president of the advisory council in 1924–26. He was also a trustee of the Institute of Economics, founded in 1922; when it was merged into the Brookings Institution in 1927, he became a trustee of the latter, serving until his death.

On March 8, 1929, Warburg warned of the disaster threatened by the wild stock speculation then rampant in the United States, foreshadowing Wall Street crash of 1929 which occurred in October of that year.

He encouraged German–American cultural cooperation, helping found the Carl Schurz Memorial Foundation in 1930 and serving as its treasurer from May 1930 until his death. He also made substantial contributions to the Warburg Library in Hamburg, founded by his brother, the art historian Aby Warburg; he gave a hall known as the American House to Heidelberg University; and he made generous donations to the Academy of Political Science in Berlin.

== Death ==
Warburg died at his home in New York City on January 24, 1932, and was buried in Sleepy Hollow Cemetery in Sleepy Hollow, New York. At the time of his death, he was chairman of the Manhattan Company and a director of the Bank of Manhattan Trust Company, Farmers Loan and Trust Company of New York, First National Bank of Boston, Baltimore & Ohio Railroad, Union Pacific Railroad, Los Angeles & Salt Lake Railroad, Western Union Telegraph Company, American I.G. Chemical Company, Agfa Ansco Corporation, and Warburg & Company of Amsterdam.

== Legacy ==
The cartoon character, Oliver "Daddy" Warbucks in the Little Orphan Annie series, was purportedly inspired by Warburg's life and times. The Paul M. Warburg chair in Economics at Harvard University was named in his honor.

== Family ==
His son, James Warburg (1896–1969) was a financial adviser to Franklin D. Roosevelt in the first years of his presidency, and according to his memoirs, FDR's son, James, lived in a cottage house located on uncle Felix Warburg's New York country estate.

== Notes ==
Government offices
New office	Member of the Federal Reserve Board; 1914–1918	Succeeded by Albert Strauss
Preceded by Frederic Adrian Delano	Vice Chair of the Federal Reserve; 1916–1918	Succeeded by Albert Strauss
