= Manhattan Company =

Former American holding company

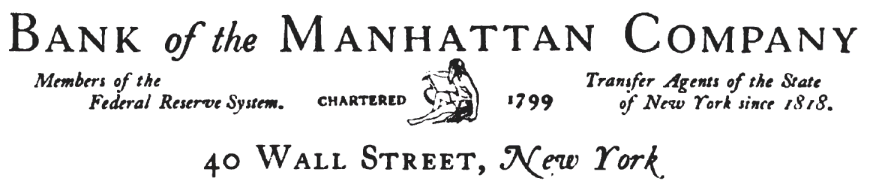
- Manhattan Company (1799-1955) letterhead, c. 1922

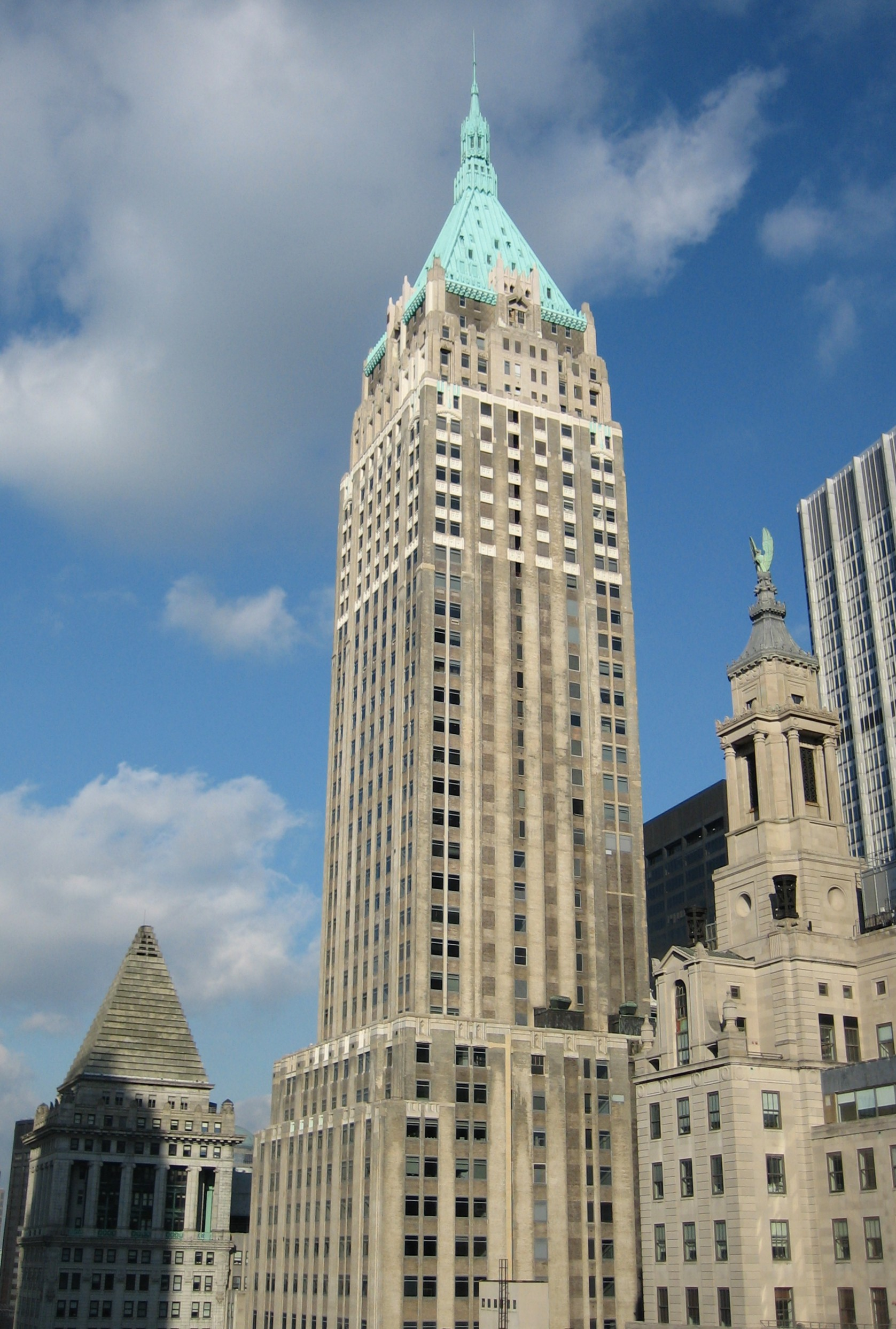
- Headquarters at 40 Wall Street in New York City
- Type: Public
- Industry: Banking
- Founded: September 1, 1799; 227 years ago by Aaron Burr, American politician and businessman
- Defunct: 1955
- Fate: Merged with Chase National Bank
- Successor: Chase Manhattan Bank
- Headquarters: 40 Wall Street, New York City, New York, U.S.

The Manhattan Company was a New York bank and holding company established on September 1, 1799. The company merged with Chase National Bank in 1955 to form the Chase Manhattan Bank. It is the oldest of the predecessor institutions that eventually formed the current JPMorgan Chase & Co.

== History ==
=== 18th century ===
The Manhattan Company was formed in 1799 with the ostensible purpose of providing clean water to Lower Manhattan. However, the main interest of the company was not in the supply of water, but rather in becoming a part of the banking industry in New York. At that time, the banking industry was monopolized by Alexander Hamilton's Bank of New York and the New York branch of the First Bank of the United States. "To circumvent the opposition of Hamilton to the establishment of a bank," and following an epidemic of yellow fever in the city, Aaron Burr founded the company and successfully gained banking privileges through a clause in its charter granted to it by the state that allowed it to use surplus capital for banking transactions. The company raised $2 million, used one hundred thousand dollars for building a water supply system, and used the rest to start the bank.

The company apparently did a poor job of supplying water, using hollowed out tree trunks for pipes and digging wells in congested areas where there was the danger of raw sewage mixing with the water. After a multitude of cholera epidemics, a water system was finally established with the construction between 1837 and 1842 of the Croton Aqueduct.

On April 17, 1799, the Manhattan Company appointed a committee "to consider the most proper means of employing the capital of the Company" and elected to open an office of discount and deposit. The "Bank" of the Manhattan Company began business on September 1, 1799, in a house at 40 Wall Street. Its first board of directors members were Daniel Ludlow, John Watts, John Barker Church, Brockholst Livingston, William Edgar, William Laight, Paschal N. Smith, Samuel Osgood, John Stevens, John Broome, John B. Coles, and Aaron Burr. Among its original stockholders were such men as Nicholas Fish, John Delafield, John Jacob Astor, Richard Varick, Stephen Van Rensselaer, John Rodgers, Joshua Sands, Peter Stuyvesant, George Clinton, Israel Disosway, John Slidell, Henry Rutgers, and Daniel Phoenix.

=== 19th century ===
In July 1800, the bank started paying dividends, and in 1808, the company sold its waterworks to the city, pocketing $1.9 million and turning completely to banking. Even so, it identified as a water company as late as 1899. The company maintained a Water Committee which yearly assured, quite truthfully, that no requests for water service had been denied, and moreover conducted its meetings with a pitcher of the water at hand to ensure quality.

In 1825, John Gerard Coster was appointed president of the company. He was succeeded by Maltby Gelston in 1829. Gelston, a former member of the New York State Assembly, was the son of Collector David Gelston and the father of Mary Gelston, who married Henry Rogers Winthrop (father of Buchanan Winthrop).

In 1847, Caleb O. Halsted, a cloth merchant from Elizabeth, New Jersey, was made president of the bank. Halsted succeeded Jonathan Thompson, who had been made president in 1840. Before he was president, Thompson had served nine years as the Collector of the Port of New York having been appointed by President James Monroe and also serving under John Quincy Adams. In 1853, the Manhattan Company became one of the original 52 members of the New York Clearing House Association.

In 1860, the board of directors promoted James M. Morrison as president of the bank to succeed Halsted. Morrison, who had begun working for the bank as the "first teller" in 1840, served as president until ill health forced him to resign in the latter part of 1879. Morrison was succeeded by John S. Harberger, who began working for the bank in 1857 as assistant cashier. Harberger died of malarial fever a year later in October 1880.

In October 1880, William Henry Smith of the dry goods house of William H. Smith & Co. was elected to succeed Harberger as president of the Bank of the Manhattan Company. By 1885, Smith had retired from the company but remained interested in the affairs of the LaFarge Decorative Arts Company.

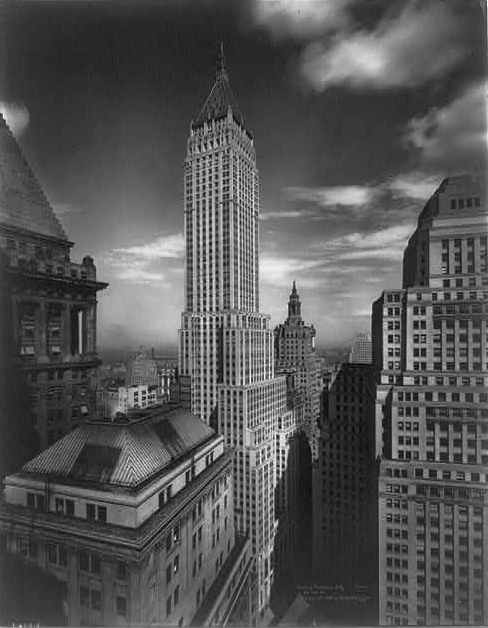
The Manhattan Company Building at 40 Wall Street

In 1891, the board of directors of the Bank of Manhattan Trust Company elected Stephen Baker vice president. Baker, a son of former U.S. Representative Stephen Baker and protégé of financier John Stewart Kennedy, was the grandson of Stephen Baker, a New York merchant who was one of the original stockholders of the Manhattan Company. Two years later, in 1893, Baker was elected president at the age of only 34, succeeding John Stewart Kennedy who served as president pro tem for a few months following the resignation of D. C. Hays.

=== 20th century ===
During his tenure as president, the bank expanded from its single original office at 40 Wall Street, opened in September 1799, to a chain of forty-eight offices in many different sections of New York City, with resources of $300,000,000. It also absorbed, in succession, the Bank of Long Island, the Bank of the Metropolis, and the Merchants' National Bank of New York on March 1, 1920, effective March 27, 1920. Merchants' then president, Raymond E. Jones, became vice president and second in command of the combined institutions. Coincidentally, Merchants' National had been chartered in 1804 through the efforts of Alexander Hamilton as a rival to the Manhattan Company, launched by Aaron Burr.

In 1923, it moved its headquarters briefly to the Prudence Building and then in May 1929, construction began on what was briefly the tallest building in the world, at 40 Wall Street (known as the Bank of Manhattan Trust Building) on the site of the Gallatin Bank Building, from April 1930 until May 1930 when it was surpassed by the Chrysler Building.

In 1927, after thirty-four years as president, and an increase from one branch to a network with forty-eight branches and an increase in deposits to $300,000,000, Baker turned the presidency and a considerable stock ownership over to his son, J. Stewart Baker, who had just turned thirty-four. The elder Baker served as chairman of the board until 1932 when he became honorary chairman and was again succeeded by his son.

In 1928, the Company increased its capital from $12,500,000 to $15,000,000 in connection with its acquisition of the Flushing National Bank, the Bayside National Bank, the Queens-Bellaire Bank, and the First National Bank of Whitestone. Later that year, it again increased its capital to $16,000,000 when it acquired the Bronx Borough Bank, and the First National Bank of Brooklyn. The acquisitions led to the bank having sixty-one offices throughout New York City.

In December 1928, the 129-year-old Bank of the Manhattan Company announced a joint affiliation with the International Acceptance Bank (and its subsidiary, the International Acceptance Trust Company), which had been organized in 1921 by Paul Warburg. The plan was for each institution to retain their present identities, but have the Bank of the Manhattan Company shareholders own the stock of the International Acceptance Bank, leading its owners to receive shares of the Bank of the Manhattan Company "in an amount that will make it one of the most important factors in that organization." (Note: During the 1928 affiliation announcement, The New York Times noted that J. Stewart Baker's great-grandfather was one of the original stockholders of the Manhattan Company in 1799; similarly, the Warburg family banking firm of M. M. Warburg & Co. (the most closely affiliated to International Acceptance), had been founded by Paul Warburg's great-grandfather in Hamburg in 1798, a year before the Manhattan Company.)

In March 1929, the shareholders of the Bank of the Manhattan Company approved its plan to increase capital from $16,000,000 to $22,500,000 to acquire all the stock of the International Acceptance Bank, Inc. After completion, J. Stewart Baker remained president of the Bank of the Manhattan Company and became vice chairman of the board of International Acceptance. (Note: In March 1929 in Paul Warburg's annual report to shareholders of the International Acceptance Bank, he stated that in the seven and a half years of its existence, the bank, with capital funds originally paid in of $10,250,000 (that had recently been increased to $12,500,000), aside from dividends paid, had added approximately $9,000,000 to surplus and hidden reserves.) Warburg became associate chairman of the board of the Bank of Manhattan and F. Abott Goodhue remained as president of International Acceptance and became a member of the board of the Bank of the Manhattan Company. The business of the International Acceptance Trust Company was taken over by the Bank of the Manhattan Company. At the same time, the two banks created the International Manhattan Company, Inc. with Warburg's son, James Warburg, as president of the new company which succeeded to the foreign securities business of the International Acceptance Bank, Inc. All of the stock of the new corporation was held by International Acceptance and the Bank of the Manhattan Company.

In December 1929, the name Bank of the Manhattan Company was abandoned and the firm was transformed into a holding corporation under the name Manhattan Company while also increasing its capital to $40,000,000 to allow for further acquisitions. (Note: The stock of the Manhattan Company was split five-for-one, and the par value of the shares changed from $100 to $20. Five of the new $20 par value shares were issued for each of the old $100 par value shares. The outstanding capital was increased to $26,000,000 by an offering of one new share at $120 for each six of the new shares held, and the remaining $14,000,000 of the authorized new capitalization was held in the treasury against further expansion.) The new holding company owned the entire capital stock of the Bank of Manhattan Trust Company, the International Acceptance Bank, and the International Manhattan Company. At that time, Baker also became president of the Bank of Manhattan Trust Company, which he later relinquished to Goodhue on December 10, 1931, to enable Baker to devote more time to the affairs of the Manhattan Company.

In February 1932, following the death of Paul Warburg on January 24, 1932, J. Stewart Baker was elected successor chairman of the board of the Manhattan Company, Warburg's son James succeeded to Baker's vice chairman role (after recently becoming president of the International Acceptance Bank) and Goodhue was elected successor chairman of the International Acceptance Bank.

In October 1932, the directors of the Manhattan Company restored the company to its old status as a bank, absorbing or distributing to shareholders the various banking institutions which it controlled. The New York Title and Mortgage Company was distributed to shareholders through a holding company, and the International Acceptance Bank, Inc. was merged into the Bank of Manhattan Trust Company, with that entity then being absorbed by the Manhattan Company. The banking business was then continued under the name Bank of the Manhattan Company and had the same capital, $56,816,466.

For some time the officers and directors of the Manhattan Company group have recognized that public opinion no longer favors the affiliation of a banking institution with other companies, and that conditions have so changed since 1929 that many of the advantages which at that time were inherent in the affiliation of various companies through a holding company have disappeared.

By March 31, 1938, the Bank of the Manhattan Company reported total deposits of $505,477,944 and total assets of $612,951,711, compared, respectively, with $504,800,925 and $566,271,489 on December 31, 1937.

In December 1948, Goodhue retired as president of the combined bank and was succeeded by Lawrence C. Marshall, who served as president of the bank until 1955.

The bank merged with Chase National Bank in 1955 to become Chase Manhattan.

In 1996, Chase Manhattan was acquired by Chemical Bank, which retained the Chase name, to form what was then the largest bank holding company in the United States.

=== 21st century ===
In December 2000, the bank acquired J.P. Morgan & Co. to form JPMorgan Chase & Co.

Standard Chartered Bank (Hong Kong) Limited continues as of August 2020 to issue a credit card by the name of Manhattan, descending from its acquisition of the retail banking business in Hong Kong of Chase Manhattan in 2000.

== List of presidents of the Manhattan Company ==
- Daniel Ludlow, 1799
- Henry Remsen, 1808
- John Gerard Coster, 1825
- Maltby Gelston, 1829
- Jonathan Thompson, 1840
- Caleb O. Halsted, 1847
- James M. Morrison, 1860
- John S. Harberger, 1879
- William Henry Smith, 1880
- D. C. Hays
- John Stewart Kennedy, 1893
- Stephen Baker, 1893
- J. Stewart Baker, 1927
- F. Abott Goodhue, 1932
- Lawrence C. Marshall, 1948

== See also ==
- Gallatin Bank Building
- Morris Abraham Schapiro
