= James Warburg =

American banker and writer (1896–1969)

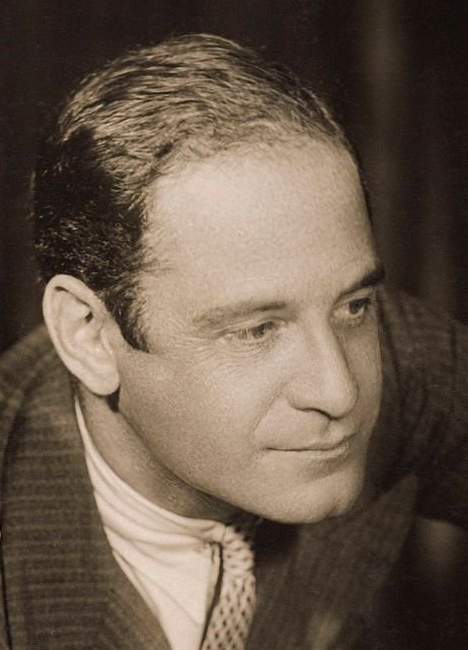
- Warburg in 1930
- Born: James Paul Warburg; August 18, 1896; Hamburg, German Empire
- Died: June 3, 1969 (aged 72); Washington, D.C., United States
- Education: Harvard University
- Occupations: Banker, businessman, writer
- Known for: Key member of Franklin Roosevelt brain trust
- Spouse(s): Kay Swift (divorced); Phyllis Baldwin (divorced); Joan Melber
- Children: with Swift: • April Gagliano • Andrea Kaufman • Kay Levin with Melber: • James P. Warburg, Jr. • Jennifer Warburg • Philip Warburg • Sally Bliumis-Dunn
- Parent(s): Nina Loeb; Paul Warburg

James Paul Warburg (August 18, 1896 – June 3, 1969) was a German-born American banker, businessman, and writer. He was well known for being the financial adviser to Franklin D. Roosevelt. His father was banker Paul Warburg, member of the Warburg family and "father" of the Federal Reserve System. After World War II, Warburg helped organize the Society for the Prevention of World War III in support of the Morgenthau Plan.

== Biography ==
Born in Hamburg, Germany to a Jewish family, he was educated at Middlesex School and Harvard University. He served in the Navy Flying Corps during World War I before entering a career in business. He was at the First National Bank of Boston between 1919 and 1921. Between 1921 and 1929 he was vice president at the International Acceptance Bank. He was president at the International Manhattan Company from 1929 to 1931, then president of the International Acceptance Bank from 1931 to 1932. He was Vice Chairman of the Board at Bank of the Manhattan Company between 1932 and 1935.

While at the Bank of the Manhattan, he became financial adviser to President Roosevelt. This included acting as financial adviser at the 1933 London World Economic Conference.

Warburg left government in 1934, having come to oppose certain policies of the New Deal. He was opposed to political non-interventionism, however, and re-entered government service in 1941 as Special Assistant to the Coordinator of Information, William Joseph Donovan. In 1942, when propaganda responsibilities were transferred to the Office of War Information, he became its Overseas Branch Deputy Director. After the end of the war, he wrote numerous books on U.S. foreign policy and was an outspoken advocate for nuclear disarmament. In 1963, along with Sears heir, Philip Stern, he helped to found the Washington-based Institute for Policy Studies. Warburg was a member of the Council on Foreign Relations. He gained some notice in a February 17, 1950, appearance before the U.S. Senate Committee on Foreign Relations in which he said, "We shall have world government, whether or not we like it. The question is only whether world government will be achieved by consent or by conquest."

== Personal life ==
In 1918, Warburg married composer and musician Kay Swift. Swift was a Protestant and Warburg's uncle, Jacob Schiff, objected to the marriage. They had three daughters: April Carlotta Warburg Gagliano, Andrea Warburg Kaufman, and Kay Levin. They divorced in late 1934 as a consequence of her long involvement with George Gershwin. In 1935, Warburg married his second wife, Phyllis Baldwin. On September 6, 1948, he married his third wife, Joan Melber, a Congregationalist, in a Christian ceremony. They had four children: James P. Jr., Jennifer, Philip, and Sally Bliumis-Dunn. Warburg is also the grandfather of novelist Katharine Weber, daughter of Andrea.

== Works ==
Books

- It's Up to Us. New York: Alfred A. Knopf, 1934.
- Hell Bent for Election. New York: Doubleday Doran, 1935.
- Still Hell Bent. New York: Doubleday, 1936.
- The West In Crisis.

New York: Doubleday 1959.

- The Long Road Home: The Autobiography of a Maverick. New York: Doubleday, 1964.
- Western Intruders: America's Role in the Far East. New York: Atheneum Books, 1967.

Music Under the pseudonym "Paul James" (his first and middle names reversed), he wrote the lyrics to Swift's 1929 hit song "Can't We Be Friends?" and all their songs in the 1930 musical, Fine and Dandy, which introduced the very popular title song "Fine and Dandy".
