= Warburg (disambiguation) =

Warburg is a city in Germany.

Warburg may also refer to:

== Businesses and organizations ==
- M. M. Warburg & Co., German investment bank, founded 1798
- S. G. Warburg & Co., British investment bank, merged into Warburg Dillon Read
- UBS Warburg, a Swiss multinational investment bank and financial services company
- Warburg Institute, founded by Aby Warburg
- Warburg Pincus, a private equity firm, founded by Eric Warburg

== People ==
- Warburg family
  - Aby Warburg (1866–1929), German art historian, founder of the Warburg Institute
  - Anna Warburg (1881–1967), Swedish educator
  - Mary Warburg (artist) (1866–1934), German artist, wife of Aby Warburg
  - Gerson Warburg (1765–1826), Hamburg banker
  - Max Warburg (1867–1946), Hamburg banker
  - Moses Marcus Warburg (1763–1830), Hamburg banker, founder of M. M. Warburg & Co., Hamburg
  - Paul Warburg (1868–1932), German-born American investment banker, former Federal Reserve Vice Chairman and one of the fathers of the Federal Reserve System
  - Felix M. Warburg (1871–1937), New York banker
  - Frieda Schiff Warburg (1867–1958), American philanthropist
  - James Warburg (1896–1969), American banker, financial adviser to Franklin D. Roosevelt
  - Frederick M. Warburg (1897–1973), New York banker
  - Eric M. Warburg (1900–1990), German banker and goodwill ambassador, namesake of the Eric M. Warburg Prize
  - Bettina Warburg (1900–1990), psychiatrist
  - Siegmund George Warburg (1902–1982), founder of S. G. Warburg & Co., London
  - Paul F. Warburg (1904–1965), American banker
  - Edward Warburg (1908–1992), American philanthropist
- the German Warburg family
  - Emil Warburg (1846–1931), physicist
  - Otto Warburg (botanist) (1859–1938), German-Jewish botanist
  - Otto Heinrich Warburg (1883–1970), physiologist, winner of the 1931 Nobel Prize in Physiology or Medicine

=== Other people ===
- Carl Warburg (c. 1805–1892), German physician and scientist
- Eugene Warburg (1825—1859), African-American sculptor
- Agnes Warburg (1872–1953), British photographer
- Sydney Warburg (1880–1947), the pen name of an anonymous author who published a book about funding of the Nazi Party by American bankers
- Fredric Warburg (1898–1981), publisher, founder of Secker and Warburg
- E. F. Warburg (1908–1966), English botanist
- Mary Warburg (1908–2009), American philanthropist
- Margit Warburg (born 1952), Danish sociologist of religion
- Sam Warburg (born 1983), American tennis player
- Kai von Warburg (born 1968), German lightweight rower
- Otto Warburg (disambiguation)

== Places ==
- Warburg, Alberta, village in Canada
- Kfar Warburg, village in Israel
- Sde Warburg, village in Israel
- Warburg Nature Reserve, in Oxfordshire, England

== Science and medicine ==
- Anderson-Warburg syndrome or Norrie disease, a genetic disorder that primarily affects the eye
- Warburg coefficient, the diffusion coefficient of ions in solution
- Warburg effect (oncology), a hypothesis of cancer growth
- Warburg effect (plant physiology), the decrease in the rate of photosynthesis caused by high oxygen concentrations
- Warburg element, an equivalent electrical circuit component
- Warburg hypothesis, a hypothesis of cancer growth
- Warburg Sjo Fledelius Syndrome or Micro syndrome, a rare autosomal recessive genetic disorder
- Warburg syndrome, a rare form of autosomal recessive congenital muscular dystrophy
- Warburg's tincture, pharmaceutical drug invented in 1834 by Dr Carl Warburg

== Other ==
- Battle of Warburg (31 July 1760), during the Seven Years' War

== See also ==
- Warberg, Germany
- Wartburg (disambiguation)
- Warburg effect (disambiguation)
