= Warburg effect =

The Warburg effect, named for Otto Heinrich Warburg, may refer to:

- Warburg effect (embryology)
- Warburg effect inversion
- Warburg effect (oncology)
- Warburg effect (plant physiology)

== See also ==
- Warburg hypothesis
- Oncometabolism#Warburg Effect
