= Otto Heinrich Warburg =

German physiologist and Nobel laureate (1883–1970)

Otto Heinrich Warburg ForMemRS
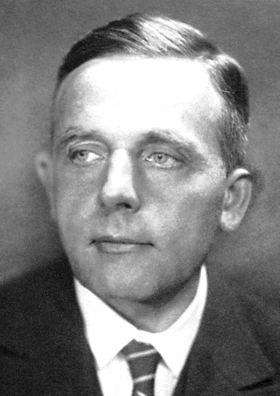
- Otto Heinrich Warburg
- Born: 8 October 1883; Freiburg, Baden, German Empire
- Died: 1 August 1970 (aged 86); Berlin, West Germany
- Education: University of Berlin; University of Heidelberg
- Known for: Oncometabolism; Warburg hypothesis Warburg effect (oncology); Warburg effect (plant physiology); Warburg–Christian method
- Father: Emil Warburg
- Awards: Iron Cross 1st class (1918); Nobel Prize in Physiology or Medicine (1931); Pour le Mérite (Civil Class) (1952); Paul Ehrlich and Ludwig Darmstaedter Prize (1962)
- Scientific career
- Fields: Cell biology
- Workplaces: Kaiser Wilhelm Institute for Biology
- Doctoral advisor: Emil Fischer; Ludolf von Krehl
- Other academic advisors: Emil Fischer, Ludolf von Krehl

Otto Heinrich Warburg (German pronunciation: [ˈɔto ˈvaːɐ̯bʊʁk], /ˈvɑːrbɜːrɡ/; 8 October 1883 – 1 August 1970) was a German physiologist, medical doctor, and Nobel laureate. He served as an officer in the elite Uhlans (cavalry) during the First World War, and was awarded the Iron Cross (1st Class) for bravery. He was the sole recipient of the Nobel Prize in Physiology or Medicine in 1931. In total, he was nominated for the award 48 times over the course of his career.

== Early life and education ==
Otto Heinrich Warburg was born in Freiburg im Breisgau on 8 October 1883, close to the Swiss border. Otto's mother was the daughter of a Protestant family of bankers and civil servants from Baden. His father, Emil Warburg, had converted to Protestantism as an adult, although Emil's parents were Orthodox Jews. Emil was a member of the illustrious Warburg family of Altona. Emil was also president of the Physikalische Reichsanstalt, Wirklicher Geheimer Oberregierungsrat (True Senior Privy Counselor).

Otto Warburg studied chemistry under Emil Fischer, and earned his doctorate in chemistry in Berlin in 1906. He then studied under Ludolf von Krehl and earned the degree of doctor of medicine in Heidelberg in 1911.

Between 1908 and 1914, Warburg was affiliated with the Naples Marine Biological Station, (in Naples, Italy), where he conducted research. In later years, he would return for visits, and maintained a lifelong friendship with the family of the station's director, Anton Dohrn.

== World War I service ==
A lifelong equestrian, he served as an officer in the elite Uhlans (cavalry) on the front during the First World War, where he won the Iron Cross. Warburg later credited this experience with affording him invaluable insights into "real life" outside the confines of academia. Toward the end of the war, when the outcome was unmistakable, Albert Einstein, who had been a friend of Warburg's father Emil, wrote to Warburg at the behest of friends, asking him to leave the army and return to academia, since it would be a tragedy for the world to lose his talents. Einstein and Warburg later became friends, and Einstein's work in physics had a great influence on Warburg's biochemical research.

== Scientific work and Nobel Prize ==
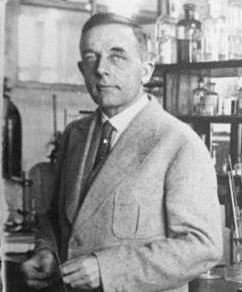
Otto H. Warburg, 1931

While working at the Marine Biological Station, Warburg performed research on oxygen consumption in sea urchin eggs after fertilization and showed that upon fertilization the rate of respiration increases as much as sixfold. His experiments also showed that iron is essential for the development of the larval stage.

In 1918, Warburg was appointed professor at the Kaiser Wilhelm Institute for Biology in Berlin-Dahlem (part of the Kaiser-Wilhelm-Gesellschaft). By 1931 he was named director of the Kaiser Wilhelm Institute for Cell Physiology, which had been founded the previous year by a donation of the Rockefeller Foundation to the Kaiser Wilhelm Gesellschaft (since renamed the Max Planck Society).

Warburg investigated the metabolism of tumors and the respiration of cells, particularly cancer cells, and in 1931 was awarded the Nobel Prize in Physiology for his "discovery of the nature and mode of action of the respiratory enzyme". In particular, he discovered that animal tumors produce large quantities of lactic acid. The award came after receiving 46 nominations over a period of nine years beginning in 1923, 13 of which were submitted in 1931, the year he won the prize.

The Nobel laureate George Wald, having completed his Ph.D. in zoology at Columbia University, received an award from the U.S. National Research Council to study with Warburg. During his time with Warburg, 1932–1933, Wald discovered vitamin A in the retina.

== Survival under the Nazis ==
When the Nazis came to power, people of Jewish descent were forced from their professional positions, although the Nazis made exceptions. Warburg had a Protestant mother and a father with Jewish heritage (who had converted to Protestantism). According to the Reichsbürgergesetz of 1935 (cf. Nuremberg Laws), he was a Halbjude (half-Jew) or Mischling.

Nazi anti-homosexuality policy posed a further risk to Warburg due to his relationship with Jacob Heiss. Beginning around 1918, Heiss served variously as Warburg's personal aid, secretary, and administrative assistant. The couple lived together in an elegant villa in Dahlem, in Berlin.

Warburg was banned from teaching, but allowed to carry on his research. In 1941, he briefly lost his post for making remarks critical of the Nazi regime, but in a few weeks was able to resume his research following a personal order from Hitler's Chancellery. Hermann Göring also arranged for him to be classified as one-quarter Jewish. In September 1942, Warburg made an official request for equal status (Gleichstellung) with German Aryans, which was granted.

The Nazis were willing to allow Warburg to work because of his focus on metabolism and cancer. Hitler was obsessed with cancer, having lost his own mother to breast cancer at an early age. The decisive factor was Warburg's distinguished military service in the Great War, as Jewish veterans were often exempted from the loss of citizenship mandated by the Nuremberg laws. Warburg's Germanic physiognomy may also have weighed in his favor, as Hitler's Chancellery is known to have factored in eye color and face shape when evaluating Aryanization applications.

Warburg disagreed with the Nazi regime, and refused to acknowledge the Nazi salute, to the point of provoking retaliation from its officers. Authors have speculated on why he stayed in Germany under the Reich. Apple suggests that, like many others, he did not imagine how bad things could get. His own egotism may have led him to underestimate the potential threat posed by the Nazis. Others have suggested that Warburg was so totally devoted to his work that he was prepared not only to stay in Germany but to tolerate the treatment of his Jewish colleagues and relatives by the Nazis. An anecdote from Birgit Vennesland, who became a director at Warburg's institute in West Berlin in 1968, is suggestive. She said that Warburg's advice for an acquaintance who was experiencing emotional difficulties was "Tell him not to think about anything but science—think about absolutely nothing else—only science."

In 1943 Warburg relocated his laboratory to the village of Liebenburg on the outskirts of Berlin to avoid ongoing air raids. The Rockefeller Foundation reportedly offered to continue funding his work if he emigrated. After the war ended, Warburg inquired about the prospect of moving to the United States, but was turned down.

== Nomination for a second Nobel Prize ==
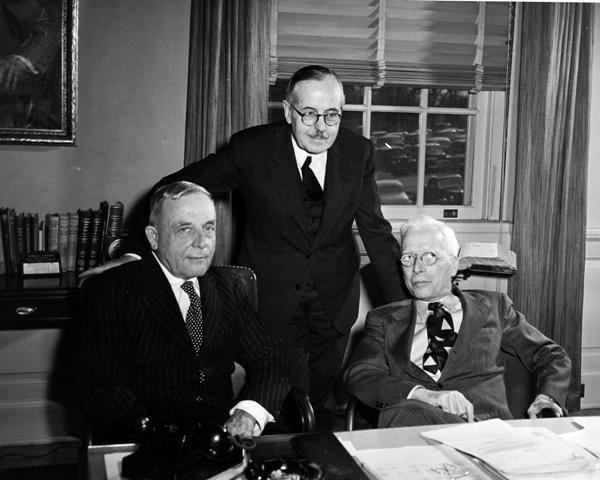
Dr. Otto Warburg (left) at the National Institute of Health, USA

In 1944, Warburg was nominated for a second Nobel Prize in Physiology by Albert Szent-Györgyi, for his work on nicotinamide, the mechanism and enzymes involved in fermentation, and the discovery of flavin (in yellow enzymes). Some sources report that he was selected to receive the award that year, but was prevented from receiving it by Adolf Hitler's regime, which had issued a decree in 1937 that forbade Germans from accepting Nobel Prizes. According to the Nobel Foundation, this rumor is not true; although he was considered a worthy candidate, he was not selected for the prize at that time.

Three scientists who worked in Warburg's lab, including Sir Hans Adolf Krebs, went on to win the Nobel Prize in future years. Among other discoveries, Krebs is credited with the identification of the citric acid cycle (or Szent-Györgyi-Krebs cycle).

Warburg's combined work in plant physiology, cell metabolism, and oncology made him an integral figure in the later development of systems biology. He worked with Dean Burk on the quantum yield of photosynthesis.

== Cancer hypothesis ==
Warburg hypothesized that cancer growth is caused by tumor cells generating energy (as, e.g., adenosine triphosphate/ATP) mainly by anaerobic breakdown of glucose (known as fermentation, or anaerobic respiration). This is in contrast to healthy cells, which generate energy mainly from oxidative breakdown of pyruvate. Pyruvate is an end product of glycolysis and is oxidized within the mitochondria. Hence, according to Warburg, cancer should be interpreted as a mitochondrial dysfunction.

Cancer, above all other diseases, has countless secondary causes. But, even for cancer, there is only one prime cause. Summarized in a few words, the prime cause of cancer is the replacement of the respiration of oxygen in normal body cells by a fermentation of sugar.

— Otto H. Warburg,

Warburg continued to develop the hypothesis experimentally and gave several prominent lectures outlining the theory and the data.

Today, mutations in oncogenes and tumor suppressor genes are thought to be responsible for malignant transformation, and the metabolic changes Warburg thought of as causative are now considered to be a result of these mutations.

A recent reevaluation of the data from nuclear/cytoplasm transfer experiments, where nuclei from cancer cells are placed in normal cytoplasm and where nuclei from normal cells are placed in cancer cytoplasm, support the role of metabolism in cancer and the mitochondria in aiding tumor suppression. Still, as evident from the references therein, this promising phenomenon still fails to explain the origin of cancer as Warburg originally proposed. While Warburg's hypothesis certainly inspired the scientific community to further investigate the field of cancer metabolism, his tendency to oversimplify perhaps prevented him from accepting the vastly complex role and interactions between both the mitochondria and nucleus, or more generally, metabolism and mutations.

== Later years ==
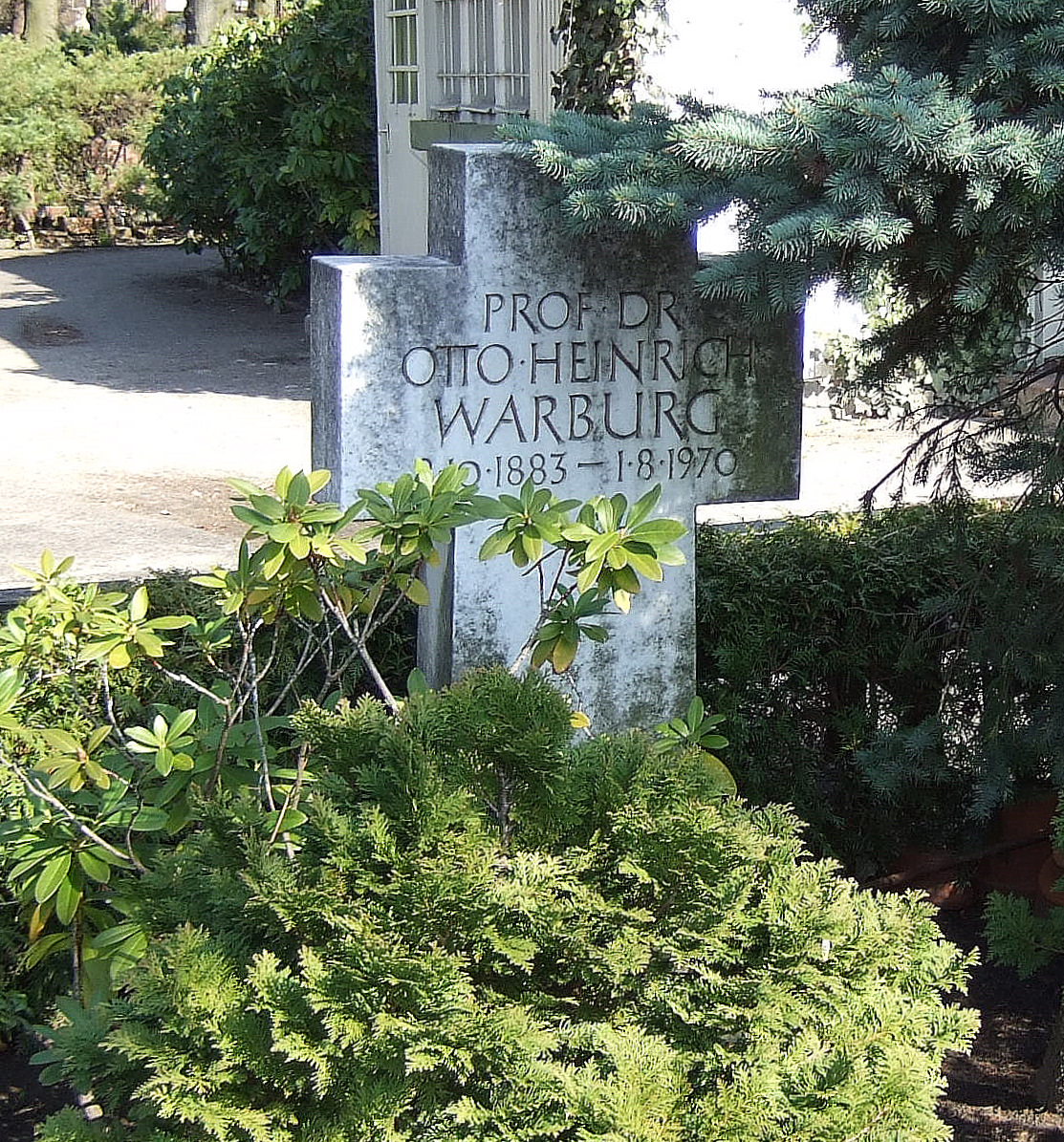
Warburg's grave in Berlin, Cemetery Dahlem

Otto Warburg edited and had much of his original work published in The Metabolism of Tumours (tr. 1931) and wrote New Methods of Cell Physiology (1962). An unabashed anglophile, Otto Warburg was thrilled when Oxford University awarded him an honorary doctorate. He was awarded the Order Pour le Mérite in 1952 and was known to tell other universities not to bother with honorary doctorates. He would ask officials to mail him medals he had been awarded so as to avoid a ceremony that would separate him from his beloved laboratory.

When frustrated by the lack of acceptance of his ideas, Warburg was known to quote an aphorism he attributed to Max Planck: "Science advances one funeral at a time".

Seemingly utterly convinced of the accuracy of his conclusions, Warburg expressed dismay at the "continual discovery of cancer agents and cancer viruses" that he expected to "hinder necessary preventive measures and thereby become responsible for cancer cases".

When Josef Issels was tried and convicted for promoting the Issels treatment, an ineffective regimen claimed to treat cancer, Warburg offered to testify on Issels' behalf at his appeal to the German Supreme Court. All of Issels' convictions were overturned.

Warburg resided in the Kaiser Wilhelm Institute with his companion of 50 years, Jacob Heiss, the secretary and manager of the Kaiser Wilhelm Institute. Warburg pursued his research until the age of 86. He left his entire estate to Heiss.

In 1968, he suffered a broken femur. This was complicated by deep vein thrombosis. He died on 1 August 1970 from pulmonary embolism and was buried in a Christian cemetery.

== The Otto Warburg Medal ==
The Otto Warburg Medal is intended to commemorate Warburg's outstanding achievements. It has been awarded by the German Society for Biochemistry and Molecular Biology (Gesellschaft für Biochemie und Molekularbiologie) since 1963. The prize honors and encourages pioneering achievements in fundamental biochemical and molecular biological research. The Otto Warburg Medal is regarded as the highest award in Germany for biochemists and molecular biologists. It has been endowed with prize money, sponsored by the publishing company Elsevier/BBA.

== See also ==
- Warburg effect inversion
- Oncometabolism
- List of Jewish Nobel laureates
