= C13H12N4O2 =

The molecular formula C_{13}H_{12}N_{4}O_{2} (molar mass: 256.26 g/mol, exact mass: 256.0960 u) may refer to:

- Lumiflavin
- 8-Phenyltheophylline (8-PT)
