= Coley's toxins =

Bacterial toxins formerly used in a precursor analogue of modern immunotherapy

Coley's toxins (also called Coley's toxin, Coley's vaccine, Coley vaccine, Coley's fluid or mixed bacterial vaccine) is a mixture containing toxins filtered from killed bacteria of species Streptococcus pyogenes and Serratia marcescens, named after William Coley, a surgical oncologist at the Hospital for Special Surgery who developed the mixture in the late 19th century as a treatment for cancer. Their use in the late nineteenth and early 20th centuries represented a precursor to modern cancer immunotherapy, although at that time their mechanism of action was not completely understood.

While there are many case studies of patients with severe cancer recovering after severe bacterial infection, including a long series of case studies of patients with inoperable sarcomas published by Coley himself, such infections carried risks of harming the patient, for which reason they were only offered to patients with advanced disease and poor prognosis. The formulation of the toxins and techniques used varied from patient to patient, leading to a lack of statistical evidence about their efficacy. Modern treatments that say they use Coley's toxins rely on a different formulation than the one Coley originally used.

== Efficacy ==
During Coley's lifetime, he applied his technique to over 1000 patients, and other doctors applied it to thousands more. For patients with inoperable sarcoma, his treatments had a five-year survival rate of over 50% and a cure rate of 10%, with some patients surviving with no evidence of disease for over 20 years. One of its last reported clinical uses was in China in the 1980s, in a study of patients with advanced liver cancer; it resulted in the complete remission of one terminal liver cancer and significant benefits from others that were too advanced for surgery, but no significant benefit for those who had surgery.

Coley's daughter Helen Coley Nauts founded the Cancer Research Institute, continuing his research and publishing monographs of case studies of his patients and another 450 patients who developed naturally occurring severe infections, following them throughout their lives.

However treatments using Coley's toxins (or the conditions of similar infections acquired by patients who developed them naturally) tended to be different for each patient, limiting the replicability of studies and limiting what conclusions were drawn from those studies. As a result, according to Cancer Research UK, "available scientific evidence does not currently support claims that Coley's toxins can treat cancer", and people with cancer who use such a treatment as a substitute for conventional treatments risk seriously harming their health.

== History ==
Bacterial immunotherapy for the treatment of cancer has been utilized throughout history, with the earliest cases going back to c. 2600 BC. Egyptian physician Imhotep treated tumors by a poultice, followed by incision, to facilitate the development of infection in the desired location and cause regression of the tumors. In the 13th century, St. Peregrine experienced spontaneous regression of tumor, after the tumor became infected.

In the 18th and 19th centuries, deliberate infection of tumors was a standard treatment, whereby surgical wounds were left open to facilitate the development of infection. Throughout the time period, physicians reported successful treatment of cancer by exposing the tumor to infection. In the early 19th century, a French physician named Dussosoy was reported to have covered an ulcerated breast carcinoma with cloth soaked in gangrenous discharge, resulting in disappearance of the tumor. In 1884, Anton Chekhov, in his capacity as a physician, recorded a relationship between erysipelas and remission of cancer.

=== Coley's studies ===
Coley started his investigations after the death of one of his first patients, Elizabeth Dashiell, from sarcoma. Dashiell was a close childhood friend of John D. Rockefeller Jr., who later indicated that her death was what first motivated his subsequent funding of cancer research.

Frustrated by this case, Coley's subsequent research led him to announce evidence of the apparent relationship between infection and cancer regression, which he published in 1891. His initial attempts at deliberate infection were mixed, but in 1893 he began combining Streptococcus pyogenes and Serratia marcescens, based upon research from G.H. Roger indicating that this combination led to greater virulence.

Coley published the results of his work as a case series. He used his toxins to treat patients with a number of types of cancer from 1893 until his death in 1936. The treatment was used by other doctors to treat patients until 1963, when new drug classifications restricted their use to clinical trials.

Within the preparation's first decade, it was changed from an unfiltered mixture of killed bacteria to a porcelain-filtered mixture, which reduced the adverse effect profile. Starting in 1923, Parke-Davis was a commercial source of Coley's toxins in the United States. However Hall reported that the versions used by Coley himself continued to be custom-compounded, using a formula that he never standardized.

Changes in the formulation of the toxins over the decades, the variable effect of treatment on different types of cancer, and the lack of a modern clinical trial demonstrating the efficacy of a particular formulation for a particular cancer, made it difficult to interpret the results of Coley's case studies with confidence.

=== Modern studies ===
In 1953, Coley's daughter Helen founded the Cancer Research Institute to continue his research and other studies of immunological treatments for cancer.

In the wake of the thalidomide controversy and the Kefauver Harris Amendment of 1962, Coley's toxins were assigned "new drug" status by the Food and Drug Administration (FDA), making it illegal to prescribe them outside of clinical trials. Since then, several small clinical trials have been conducted with mixed results.

In Germany, Coley's toxins were also produced by the small German pharmaceutical company Südmedica and sold under the trade name Vaccineurin. In 1985, Einar Göhring began studying a similar approach to "active fever therapy" for treating cancer. In 1990 Vaccineurin stopped production and did not get re-approval by the German Federal Institute for Drugs and Medical Devices.

In 1997, the Coley Pharmaceutical Group was founded as a private company to research modern formulations of similar treatments. It was acquired by Pfizer in 2008.

As of 2008, according to the American Cancer Society, "more research would be needed to determine what benefit, if any, this therapy might have for people with cancer".

== Rationale ==
Multiple rationales have been proposed for how Coley's toxins might work.

=== Macrophages ===
One rationale argues that macrophages are either in "repair mode", furthering the growing of cancer, or in "defense mode", destroying cancer. However, macrophages are in "defense mode" only if there is some recognized enemy. As cancer tissue is not recognized as enemy (but as normal body tissue), there is a need to bring more macrophages into "defense mode" by simulating an infection. The simulated infection results in a real fever. Unlike hyperthermia, real fever not only means heating of the body but also higher activity of the immune system. Thus, fever is seen as a precondition for a therapy using Coley's toxins to succeed.

=== Tumor necrosis factor and interleukin ===
One of the agents in Coley's toxins that is thought to be biologically active is a lipopolysaccharide which causes fever. The resulting fever from the lipopolysaccharide is thought to increase lymphocyte activity and boosts tumor necrosis factor (TNF). Tsung and Norton in Surgical Oncology reported that the active agent was thought to be interleukin-12, rather than TNF.

=== Effects specific to Streptococcus ===
One hypothesis argues that streptokinase (produced by killed bacteria of S. pyogenes together with plasminogen from the patient) is the active agent of Coley's toxins. This hypothesis is supported by the fact that streptokinase has been associated with successful treatment of thromboangiitis obliterans.

Another hypothesis is that a cardiolipin, a fatty molecule in the S. pyogenes membrane, is immunogenic, triggering a targeted immune response.

=== Dendritic cells ===
A robust fever, which occurs in response to Coley's toxins, generates inflammatory factors with co-stimulatory activity, which activate resting dendritic cells (DC), leading to the activation of anergic T cells, possibly accomplished through a second process, where physical damage to cancer cells leads to a sudden supply of cancer antigens to the dendritic cell population.

== Availability ==
As of 2025, Coley's toxins are generally not available where approval or license is required. However some private clinics and specialized doctors do use them to treat some patients. In the US, the Waisbren Clinic in Wisconsin has offered such treatment since 1972, for patients who have already undergone conventional treatment without success.

In Germany, some specialized medical doctors apply Coley's toxins to patients. They can do so legally because, in Germany, unapproved medications may be produced, although they may not be sold or given away. Physicians can go to special laboratories and produce Coley's toxins there using their own hands. Coley's toxins may still be applied by a licensed medical doctor, because in Germany there is "Therapiefreiheit" ("therapy freedom"), the legal right to apply whichever therapy a physician considers to be appropriate in the light of their medical knowledge. For example, Dr. Josef Issels used several unconventional treatments for cancer patients, including Coley's toxins, in the second half of the 20th century.

This kind of therapy is offered as "Fiebertherapie" (fever therapy) or "active fever therapy", a term introduced by E. Göhring in 1985.

=== Pharmaceutical research ===
A private biotech company, Coley Pharmaceutical Group, was founded in 1997 and conducted clinical trials using genetic sequences which may have contributed to Coley's toxin's effectiveness. It was acquired by Pfizer in January 2008. The French pharmaceutical company Sanofi has also shown interest in modern versions of Coley's toxins.

== Professional politics ==
According to an article in the Iowa Orthopedic Journal, Coley's toxins were opposed by the medical establishment despite his reports of good results, because his reports were not believed to be credible. Stephen Hall explored the issue through the lens of the decades-long, complicated relationship of James Ewing and Coley as colleagues at the same institution. Hall suggested that aspects of Coley's work that were scientifically underpowered, including the lack of a standardized formula for the toxin preparations, were not well suited to the growing field of replicable clinical trials, leading other doctors to dismiss the use of Coley's toxins.

The toxins never made it to the stage of a safe and effective medication, and their application may have depended on idiotypic molecular factors which even today are still not easy for immunotherapy designers to deal with.

== See also ==
- Immunotherapy
- Cancer immunotherapy
- Cancer vaccine
- List of unproven and disproven cancer treatments
