= Emil Warburg =

German physicist (1846–1931)

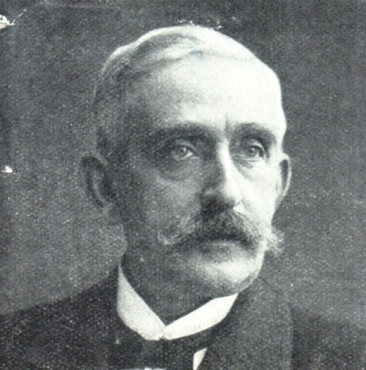
- Born: 9 March 1846; Altona, Duchy of Holstein
- Died: 28 July 1931 (aged 85); Bayreuth, Weimar Republic
- Education: University of Berlin
- Known for: Magnetic refrigeration Warburg coefficient Warburg element
- Children: Otto Heinrich Warburg
- Scientific career
- Fields: Physics
- Workplaces: University of Berlin; University of Strassburg; University of Freiburg
- Thesis: De systematis corporum vibrantium (1867)
- Doctoral advisor: Heinrich Gustav Magnus
- Doctoral students: Gustav Heinrich Angenheister; Eduard Grüneisen; James Franck; Julius Edgar Lilienfeld; Edgar Meyer; R. W. Pohl
- Other notable students: Hans von Euler-Chelpin; William Duane

Emil Gabriel Warburg (German pronunciation: [ˈeːmiːl ˈvaːɐ̯bʊʁk]; 9 March 1846 – 28 July 1931) was a German physicist who during his career was professor of physics at the Universities of Strassburg, Freiburg and Berlin. He was elected to honorary membership of Manchester Literary and Philosophical Society on 17 April 1894. He was president of the Deutsche Physikalische Gesellschaft 1899–1905. His name is notably associated with the Warburg element of electrochemistry.

Among his students were James Franck (Nobel Prize in Physics, 1925), Eduard Grüneisen, Robert Pohl, Erich Regener and Hans von Euler-Chelpin (Nobel Prize in Chemistry, 1929). He carried out research in the areas of kinetic theory of gases, electrical conductivity, gas discharges, heat radiation, ferromagnetism and photochemistry.

He was the father of Otto Heinrich Warburg (Nobel Prize in Physiology, 1931). He was a friend of Albert Einstein.
