= Aerobic fermentation =

Fermentation with oxygen

Aerobic fermentation or aerobic glycolysis is a metabolic process by which cells metabolize sugars via fermentation in the presence of oxygen and occurs through the repression of normal respiratory metabolism. Preference of aerobic fermentation over aerobic respiration is referred to as the Crabtree effect in yeast, and is part of the Warburg effect in tumor cells. While aerobic fermentation does not produce adenosine triphosphate (ATP) in high yield, it allows proliferating cells to convert nutrients such as glucose and glutamine more efficiently into biomass by avoiding unnecessary catabolic oxidation of such nutrients into carbon dioxide, preserving carbon-carbon bonds and promoting anabolism.

== Aerobic fermentation in yeast ==
Aerobic fermentation evolved independently in at least three yeast lineages (Saccharomyces, Dekkera, Schizosaccharomyces). It has also been observed in plant pollen, trypanosomatids, mutated E. coli, and tumor cells. Crabtree-positive yeasts will respire when grown with very low concentrations of glucose or when grown on most other carbohydrate sources. The Crabtree effect is a regulatory system whereby respiration is repressed by fermentation, except in low sugar conditions. When Saccharomyces cerevisiae is grown below the sugar threshold and undergoes a respiration metabolism, the fermentation pathway is still fully expressed, while the respiration pathway is only expressed relative to the sugar availability. This contrasts with the Pasteur effect, which is the inhibition of fermentation in the presence of oxygen and observed in most organisms.

The evolution of aerobic fermentation likely involved multiple successive molecular steps, which included the expansion of hexose transporter genes, copy number variation (CNV) and differential expression in metabolic genes, and regulatory reprogramming. Research is still needed to fully understand the genomic basis of this complex phenomenon. Many Crabtree-positive yeast species are used for their fermentation ability in industrial processes in the production of wine, beer, sake, bread, and bioethanol. Through domestication, these yeast species have evolved, often through artificial selection, to better fit their environment. Strains evolved through mechanisms that include interspecific hybridization, horizontal gene transfer (HGT), gene duplication, pseudogenization, and gene loss.

=== Origin of Crabtree effect in yeast ===
Approximately 100 million years ago (mya), within the yeast lineage there was a whole genome duplication (WGD). A majority of Crabtree-positive yeasts are post-WGD yeasts. It was thought that the WGD was a mechanism for the development of the Crabtree effect in these species due to the duplication of alcohol dehydrogenase (ADH) encoding genes and hexose transporters. However, recent evidence has shown that aerobic fermentation originated before the WGD and evolved as a multi-step process, potentially aided by the WGD. The origin of aerobic fermentation, or the first step, in Saccharomyces Crabtree-positive yeasts likely occurred in the interval between the ability to grow under anaerobic conditions, horizontal transfer of anaerobic DHODase (encoded by URA1 with bacteria), and the loss of respiratory chain Complex I. A more pronounced Crabtree effect, the second step, likely occurred near the time of the WGD event. Later evolutionary events that aided in the evolution of aerobic fermentation are better understood and outlined in the section discussing the genomic basis of the Crabtree effect.

=== Driving forces ===
It is believed that a major driving force in the origin of aerobic fermentation was its simultaneous origin with modern fruit (~125 mya). These fruits provided an abundance of simple sugar food source for microbial communities, including both yeast and bacteria. Bacteria, at that time, were able to produce biomass at a faster rate than the yeast. Producing a toxic compound, like ethanol, can slow the growth of bacteria, allowing the yeast to be more competitive. However, the yeast still had to use a portion of the sugar it consumes to produce ethanol. Crabtree-positive yeasts also have increased glycolytic flow, or increased uptake of glucose and conversion to pyruvate, which compensates for using a portion of the glucose to produce ethanol rather than biomass. Therefore, it is believed that the original driving force was to kill competitors. This is supported by research that determined the kinetic behavior of the ancestral ADH protein, which was found to be optimized to make ethanol, rather than consume it.

Further evolutionary events in the development of aerobic fermentation likely increased the efficiency of this lifestyle, including increased tolerance to ethanol and the repression of the respiratory pathway. In high sugar environments, S. cerevisiae outcompetes and dominants all other yeast species, except its closest relative Saccharomyces paradoxus. The ability of S. cerevisiae to dominate in high sugar environments evolved more recently than aerobic fermentation and is dependent on the type of high-sugar environment. Other yeasts' growth is dependent on the pH and nutrients of the high-sugar environment.

=== Genomic basis of the Crabtree effect ===
The genomic basis of the Crabtree effect is still being investigated, and its evolution likely involved multiple successive molecular steps that increased the efficiency of the lifestyle.

=== Expansion of hexose transporter genes ===
Hexose transporters (HXT) are a group of proteins that are largely responsible for the uptake of glucose in yeast. In S. cerevisiae, 20 HXT genes have been identified and 17 encode for glucose transporters (HXT1-HXT17), GAL2 encodes for a galactose transporter, and SNF3 and RGT2 encode for glucose sensors. The number of glucose sensor genes have remained mostly consistent through the budding yeast lineage, however glucose sensors are absent from Schizosaccharomyces pombe. Sch. pombe is a Crabtree-positive yeast, which developed aerobic fermentation independently from Saccharomyces lineage, and detects glucose via the cAMP-signaling pathway. The number of transporter genes vary significantly between yeast species and has continually increased during the evolution of the S. cerevisiae lineage. Most of the transporter genes have been generated by tandem duplication, rather than from the WGD. Sch. pombe also has a high number of transporter genes compared to its close relatives. Glucose uptake is believed to be a major rate-limiting step in glycolysis and replacing S. cerevisiae's HXT1-17 genes with a single chimera HXT gene results in decreased ethanol production or fully respiratory metabolism. Thus, having an efficient glucose uptake system appears to be essential to ability of aerobic fermentation. There is a significant positive correlation between the number of hexose transporter genes and the efficiency of ethanol production.

=== CNV in glycolysis genes ===
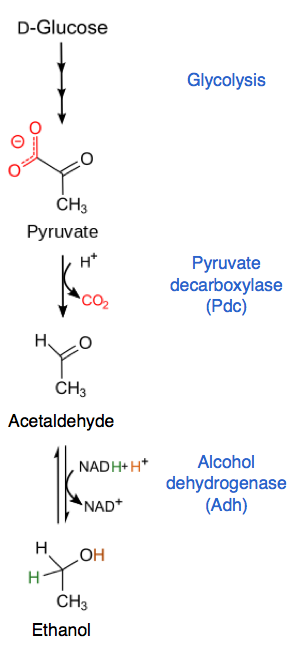
A scheme of transformation of glucose to alcohol by alcoholic fermentation.

After a WGD, one of the duplicated gene pair is often lost through fractionation; less than 10% of WGD gene pairs have remained in S. cerevisiae genome. A little over half of WGD gene pairs in the glycolysis reaction pathway were retained in post-WGD species, significantly higher than the overall retention rate. This has been associated with an increased ability to metabolize glucose into pyruvate, or higher rate of glycolysis. After glycolysis, pyruvate can either be further broken down by pyruvate decarboxylase (Pdc) or pyruvate dehydrogenase (Pdh). The kinetics of the enzymes are such that when pyruvate concentrations are high, due to a high rate of glycolysis, there is increased flux through Pdc and thus the fermentation pathway. The WGD is believed to have played a beneficial role in the evolution of the Crabtree effect in post-WGD species partially due to this increase in copy number of glycolysis genes.

=== CNV in fermentation genes ===
The fermentation reaction only involves two steps. Pyruvate is converted to acetaldehyde by Pdc and then acetaldehyde is converted to ethanol by alcohol dehydrogenase (Adh). There is no significant increase in the number of Pdc genes in Crabtree-positive compared to Crabtree-negative species and no correlation between number of Pdc genes and efficiency of fermentation. There are five Adh genes in S. cerevisiae. Adh1 is the major enzyme responsible for catalyzing the fermentation step from acetaldehyde to ethanol. Adh2 catalyzes the reverse reaction, consuming ethanol and converting it to acetaldehyde. The ancestral, or original, Adh had a similar function as Adh1 and after a duplication in this gene, Adh2 evolved a lower K_{M} for ethanol. Adh2 is believed to have increased yeast species' tolerance for ethanol and allowed Crabtree-positive species to consume the ethanol they produced after depleting sugars. However, Adh2 and consumption of ethanol is not essential for aerobic fermentation. Sch. pombe and other Crabtree positive species do not have the ADH2 gene and consumes ethanol very poorly.

=== Differential expression ===
In Crabtree-negative species, respiration related genes are highly expressed in the presence of oxygen. However, when S. cerevisiae is grown on glucose in aerobic conditions, respiration-related gene expression is repressed. Mitochondrial ribosomal proteins expression is only induced under environmental stress conditions, specifically low glucose availability. Genes involving mitochondrial energy generation and phosphorylation oxidation, which are involved in respiration, have the largest expression difference between aerobic fermentative yeast species and respiratory species. In a comparative analysis between Sch. pombe and S. cerevisiae, both of which evolved aerobic fermentation independently, the expression pattern of these two fermentative yeasts were more similar to each other than a respiratory yeast, C. albicans. However, S. cerevisiae is evolutionarily closer to C. albicans. Regulatory rewiring was likely important in the evolution of aerobic fermentation in both lineages.

=== Domestication and aerobic fermentation ===
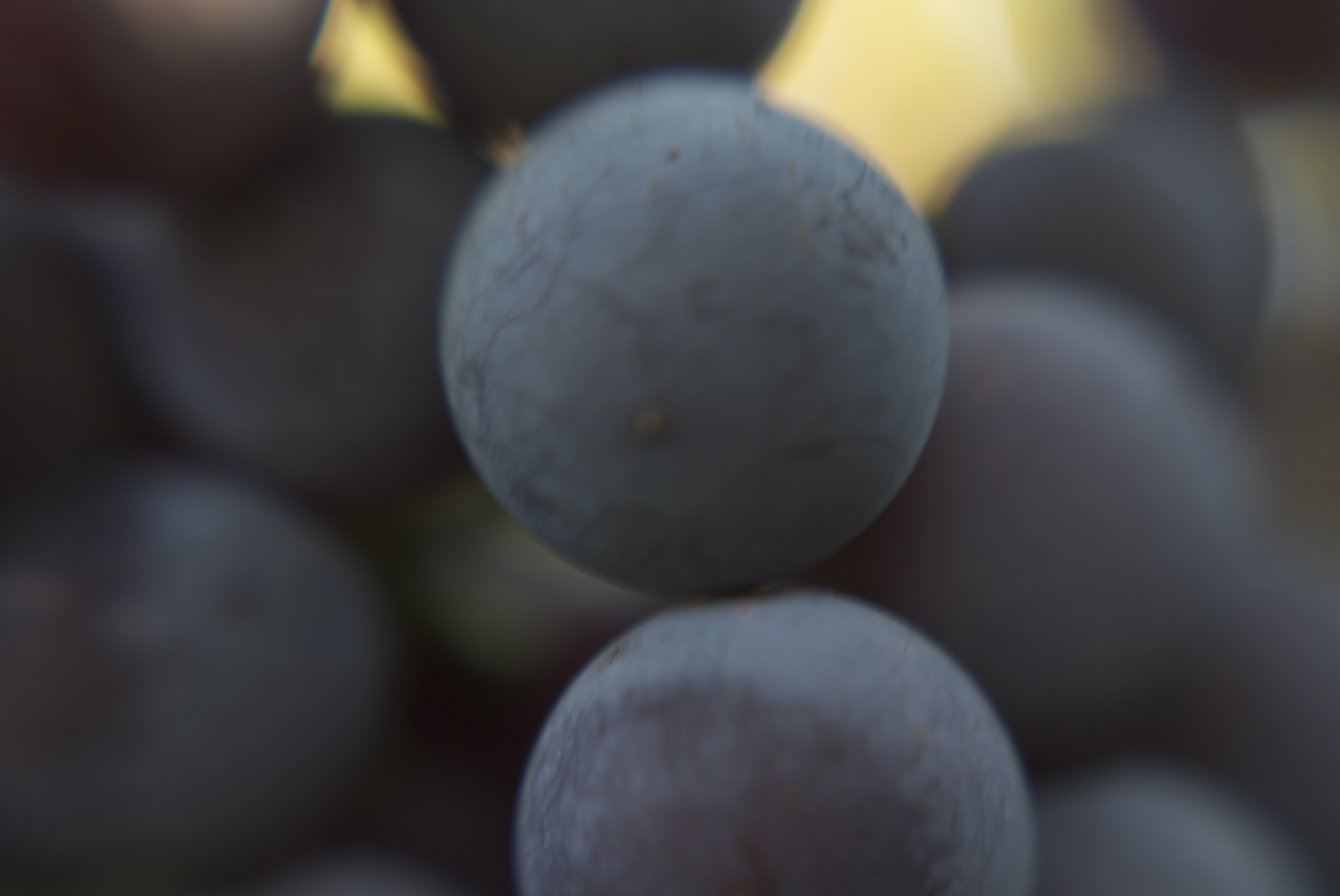
A close up picture of ripening wine grapes. The light white "dusting" is a film that also contains wild yeasts.

Aerobic fermentation is essential for multiple industries, resulting in human domestication of several yeast strains. Beer and other alcoholic beverages, throughout human history, have played a significant role in society through drinking rituals, providing nutrition, medicine, and uncontaminated water. During the domestication process, organisms shift from natural environments that are more variable and complex to simple and stable environments with a constant substrate. This often favors specialization adaptations in domesticated microbes, associated with relaxed selection for non-useful genes in alternative metabolic strategies or pathogenicity. Domestication might be partially responsible for the traits that promote aerobic fermentation in industrial species. Introgression and HGT is common in Saccharomyces domesticated strains. Many commercial wine strains have significant portions of their DNA derived from HGT of non-Saccharomyces species. HGT and introgression are less common in nature than is seen during domestication pressures. For example, the important industrial yeast strain Saccharomyces pastorianus is an interspecies hybrid of S. cerevisiae and the cold tolerant S. eubayanus. This hybrid is commonly used in lager-brewing, which requires slow, low temperature fermentation.

== Aerobic fermentation in acetic acid bacteria ==
Acetic acid bacteria (AAB) incompletely oxidize sugars and alcohols, usually glucose and ethanol, to acetic acid, in a process called AAB oxidative fermentation (AOF). After glycolysis, the produced pyruvate is broken down to acetaldehyde by pyruvate decarboxylase, which in turn is oxidized to acetic acid by acetaldehyde dehydrogenase. Ethanol is first oxidized to acetaldehyde by alcohol dehydrogenase, which is then converted to acetic acid. Both of these processes either generate NAD(P)H, or shuttle electrons into the electron transport chain via ubiquinol. This process is exploited in the use of acetic acid bacteria to produce vinegar.

== Tumor cells ==
One of the hallmarks of cancer is altered metabolism or deregulating cellular energetics. Cancers cells often have reprogrammed their glucose metabolism to perform lactic acid fermentation, in the presence of oxygen, rather than send the pyruvate made through glycolysis to the mitochondria. This is referred to as the Warburg effect and is associated with high consumption of glucose and a high rate of glycolysis. ATP production in these cancer cells is often only through the process of glycolysis and pyruvate is broken down by the fermentation process in the cell's cytoplasm.

This phenomenon is often seen as counterintuitive, since cancer cells have higher energy demands due to the continued proliferation and respiration produces significantly more ATP than glycolysis alone (fermentation produces no additional ATP). Typically, there is an up-regulation in glucose transporters and enzymes in the glycolysis pathway (also seen in yeast). There are many parallel aspects of aerobic fermentation in tumor cells that are also seen in Crabtree-positive yeasts. Further research into the evolution of aerobic fermentation in yeast such as S. cerevisiae can be a useful model for understanding aerobic fermentation in tumor cells. This has a potential for better understanding cancer and cancer treatments.

== Aerobic fermentation in other non-yeast species ==
=== Plants ===
Alcoholic fermentation is often used by plants in anaerobic conditions to produce ATP and regenerate NAD^{+} to allow for glycolysis to continue. For most plant tissues, fermentation only occurs in anaerobic conditions, but there are a few exceptions. In the pollen of maize (Zea mays) and tobacco (Nicotiana tabacum & Nicotiana plumbaginifolia), the fermentation enzyme ADH is abundant, regardless of the oxygen level. In tobacco pollen, PDC is also highly expressed in this tissue and transcript levels are not influenced by oxygen concentration. Tobacco pollen, similar to Crabtree-positive yeast, perform high levels of fermentation dependent on the sugar supply, and not oxygen availability. In these tissues, respiration and alcoholic fermentation occur simultaneously with high sugar availability. Fermentation produces the toxic acetaldehyde and ethanol, that can build up in large quantities during pollen development. It has been hypothesized that acetaldehyde is a pollen factor that causes cytoplasmic male sterility. Cytoplasmic male sterility is a trait observed in maize, tobacco and other plants in which there is an inability to produce viable pollen. It is believed that this trait might be due to the expression of the fermentation genes, ADH and PDC, a lot earlier on in pollen development than normal and the accumulation of toxic aldehyde.

=== Trypanosomatids ===
When grown in glucose-rich media, trypanosomatid parasites degrade glucose via aerobic fermentation. In this group, this phenomenon is not a pre-adaptation to/or remnant of anaerobic life, shown through their inability to survive in anaerobic conditions. It is believed that this phenomenon developed due to the capacity for a high glycolytic flux and the high glucose concentrations of their natural environment. The mechanism for repression of respiration in these conditions is not yet known.

=== E. coli mutants ===
A couple of Escherichia coli mutant strains have been bioengineered to ferment glucose under aerobic conditions. One group developed the ECOM3 (E. coli cytochrome oxidase mutant) strain by removing three terminal cytochrome oxidases (cydAB, cyoABCD, and cbdAB) to reduce oxygen uptake. After 60 days of adaptive evolution on glucose media, the strain displayed a mixed phenotype. In aerobic conditions, some populations' fermentation solely produced lactate, while others performed mixed-acid fermentation.

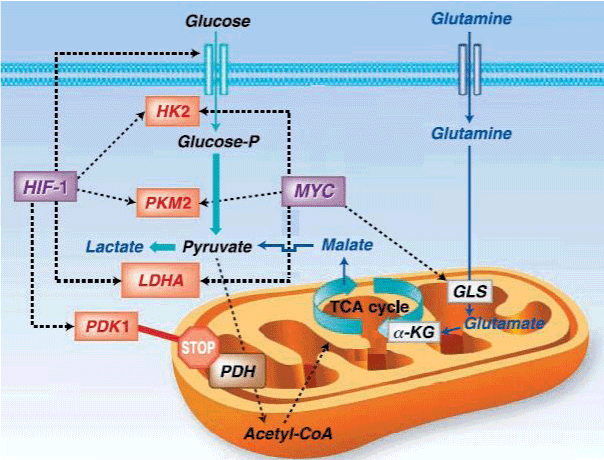
Myc and HIF-1 regulate glucose metabolism and stimulate the Warburg effect.
