= Warburg–Christian method =

The Warburg–Christian method is an ultraviolet spectroscopic protein and nucleic acid assay method based on the absorbance of UV light at 260 nm and 280 nm wavelengths. Proteins generally absorb light at 280 nanometers due to the presence of tryptophan and tyrosine. Nucleic acids absorb more at 260 nm, primarily due to purine and pyrimidine bases. The Warburg–Christian method combines measurements at these wavelengths to estimate the amounts of protein and nucleic acid present. Original description of the method appeared in 1941.

The method is named for its creators, the German cancer researcher Otto Heinrich Warburg, Nobel Prize winner, and his employee Walter Christian of the Kaiser Wilhelm Institute for Biology in Berlin.
