= Warburg effect (oncology) =

Form of metabolism in tumors

In oncology, the Warburg effect (/ˈvɑːrbʊərɡ/) is the observation that most cancers use aerobic glycolysis and lactic acid fermentation for energy generation rather than the mechanisms used by non-cancerous cells. This observation was first published by Otto Heinrich Warburg, who was awarded the 1931 Nobel Prize in Physiology for his "discovery of the nature and mode of action of the respiratory enzyme".

In fermentation, the last product of glycolysis, pyruvate, is converted into lactate or ethanol. While fermentation produces adenosine triphosphate (ATP) only in low yield compared to the citric acid cycle and oxidative phosphorylation of aerobic respiration, it allows proliferating cells to convert nutrients such as glucose and glutamine more efficiently into biomass by avoiding unnecessary catabolic oxidation of such nutrients into carbon dioxide, preserving carbon-carbon bonds and promoting anabolism. Diagnostically the increased glucose consumption by cancer cells resulting from the Warburg effect is the basis for tumor detection in a PET scan, in which an injected radioactive glucose analog is detected at higher concentrations in malignant cancers than in other tissues. The existence of the Warburg effect has fuelled popular misconceptions that cancer can be treated by dietary reductions in sugar and carbohydrate.

== Warburg's research ==
Around the 1920s, Otto Heinrich Warburg and his group concluded that deprivation of glucose and oxygen in tumor cells leads to a lack of energy, resulting in cell death. Biochemist Herbert Grace Crabtree further extended Warburg's research by discovering environmental or genetic influences. Crabtree observed that yeast, Saccharomyces cerevisiae, prefer fermentation leading to ethanol production over aerobic respiration, in aerobic conditions and in the presence of a high concentration of glucose - the Crabtree effect. Warburg observed a similar phenomenon in tumors - cancer cells tend to use fermentation for obtaining energy even in aerobic conditions - coining the term "aerobic glycolysis". The phenomenon was later termed Warburg effect after its discoverer. Warburg hypothesized that dysfunctional mitochondria may be the cause of the higher rate of glycolysis seen in tumor cells, as well as a predominant cause of cancer development.

== Basis ==
Normal cells primarily release energy through glycolysis followed by mitochondrial citric acid cycle and oxidative phosphorylation. However, most cancer cells predominantly release energy through a high rate of glycolysis followed by lactic acid fermentation even in the presence of abundant oxygen. Anaerobic glycolysis is less efficient than oxidative phosphorylation for producing adenosine triphosphate and leads to the increased generation of additional metabolites that may particularly benefit proliferating cells. The Warburg effect has been much studied, but its precise nature remains unclear, which hampers the beginning of any work that would explore its therapeutic potential.

Otto Warburg postulated this change in metabolism is the fundamental cause of cancer, a claim now known as the Warburg hypothesis. Today, mutations in oncogenes and tumor suppressor genes are thought to be responsible for malignant transformation, and the Warburg effect is considered to be a result of these mutations rather than a cause.

== Driving forces ==
Older hypotheses such as the Warburg hypothesis suggest the Warburg effect may simply be a consequence of damage to the mitochondria in cancer. It may also be an adaptation to low-oxygen environments within tumors, or a result of cancer genes shutting down the mitochondria, which are involved in the cell's apoptosis program that kills cancer cells.

=== Fermentation favors cell proliferation ===
Since glycolysis provides most of the building blocks required for cell proliferation, both cancer cells and normal proliferating cells have been proposed to need to activate glycolysis, despite the presence of oxygen, to proliferate. Inefficient ATP production is only a problem when nutrients are scarce, but anaerobic glycolysis is favored when nutrients are abundant. Anaerobic glycolysis favors anabolism and avoids oxidizing precious carbon-carbon bonds into carbon dioxide. In contrast, oxidative phosphorylation is associated with starvation metabolism and favored when nutrients are scarce and cells must maximize free energy extraction to survive. Such trade-offs can be theoretically associated with Giffen behavior in economics.

Evidence attributes some of the high anaerobic glycolytic rates to an overexpressed form of mitochondrially-bound hexokinase responsible for driving the high glycolytic activity. In kidney cancer, this effect could be due to the presence of mutations in the von Hippel–Lindau tumor suppressor gene upregulating glycolytic enzymes, including the M2 splice isoform of pyruvate kinase. TP53 mutation hits energy metabolism and increases glycolysis in breast cancer.

The Warburg effect is associated with glucose uptake and use, as this ties into how mitochondrial activity is regulated. The concern lies less in mitochondrial damage and more in the change in activity. On the other hand, tumor cells exhibit increased rates of glycolysis which can be explained with mitochondrial damage.

=== Disposal of surplus electrons ===
In cancer cells, major changes in gene expression increase glucose uptake to support their rapid growth. Unlike normal cells, which produce lactate only when oxygen is low, cancer cells convert much of the glucose to lactate even in the presence of adequate oxygen. This is known as the “Warburg Effect.” The exact reasons for this are not fully understood, but it has been hypothesized that cancer cells create lactate to manage excess cytosolic electrons that the mitochondria cannot process. The enzymes involved in pyruvate metabolism prioritize: 1) efficient ATP production via mitochondrial oxidative phosphorylation, 2) disposal of excess cytosolic electrons as lactate, and 3) biosynthesis for growth. Essentially, lactate secretion acts as disposal mechanism for surplus electrons, maintaining cellular balance.

== Molecular targets ==
As of 2013, scientists had been investigating the possibility of therapeutic value presented by the Warburg effect. The increase in nutrient uptake by cancer cells has been considered as a possible treatment target by exploitation of a critical proliferation tool in cancer, but it remains unclear whether this can lead to the development of drugs that have therapeutic benefit. Many substances have been developed which inhibit glycolysis and so have potential as anticancer agents, including SB-204990, 2-deoxy-D-glucose (2DG), 3-bromopyruvate (3-BrPA, bromopyruvic acid, or bromopyruvate), 3-bromo-2-oxopropionate-1-propyl ester (3-BrOP), 5-thioglucose and dichloroacetic acid (DCA).

A clinical trial for 2-DG [2008] showed slow accrual and was terminated. As of 2017, there is no evidence yet to support the use of DCA for cancer treatment.

Alpha-cyano-4-hydroxycinnamic acid (ACCA;CHC), a small-molecule inhibitor of monocarboxylate transporters (MCTs; which prevent lactic acid build up in tumors) has been successfully used as a metabolic target in brain tumor pre-clinical research. Higher affinity MCT inhibitors have been developed and are currently undergoing clinical trials by Astra-Zeneca.

Dichloroacetic acid (DCA), a small-molecule inhibitor of mitochondrial pyruvate dehydrogenase kinase, "downregulates" glycolysis in vitro and in vivo. Researchers at the University of Alberta theorized in 2007 that DCA might have therapeutic benefits against many types of cancer.

Pyruvate dehydrogenase catalyses the rate-limiting step in the aerobic oxidation of glucose and pyruvate and links glycolysis to the tricarboxylic acid cycle (TCA). DCA acts a structural analog of pyruvate and activates the pyruvate dehydrogenase complex (PDC) to inhibit pyruvate dehydrogenase kinases, to keep the complex in its un-phosphorylated form. DCA reduces expression of the kinases, preventing the inactivation of the PDC, and allowing the conversion of pyruvate to acetyl-CoA rather than lactate through anaerobic respiration, thereby permitting cellular respiration to continue. Through this mechanism of action, DCA works to counteract the increased production of lactate exhibited by tumor cells by enabling the TCA cycle to metabolize it by oxidative phosphorylation. DCA has not been evaluated as a sole cancer treatment yet, as research on the clinical activity of the drug is still in progress, but it has been shown to be effective when used with other cancer treatments. The neurotoxicity and pharmacokinetics of the drug still need to be monitored but if its evaluations are satisfactory it could be very useful as it is an inexpensive small molecule.

Lewis C. Cantley and colleagues found that tumor M2-PK, a form of the pyruvate kinase enzyme, promotes the Warburg effect. Tumor M2-PK is produced in all rapidly dividing cells and is responsible for enabling cancer cells to consume glucose at an accelerated rate; on forcing the cells to switch to pyruvate kinase's alternative form by inhibiting the production of tumor M2-PK, their growth was curbed. The researchers acknowledged the fact that the exact chemistry of glucose metabolism was likely to vary across different forms of cancer; however, PKM2 was identified in all of the cancer cells they had tested. This enzyme form is not usually found in quiescent tissue, though it is apparently necessary when cells need to multiply quickly, e.g., in healing wounds or hematopoiesis.

Inhibiting lactic acid production related to the Warburg effect does not affect cell division. Cytomatrix actin has been suggested to contribute to the Warburg effect, as inhibition of actin dynamics affects lactic acid production. The viscosity of the cytoplasm is vital for regulating metabolism, which is controlled by actin filaments. Extracellular signals influence actin dynamics, while molecular motors generate directed motion; the collective activity of motor proteins produces random fluctuations in the cytoplasm. The mechanical activity of actin regulates the rate of enzymatic processes by facilitating the delivery of substrates to catalytic complexes within the cytomatrix, acting as a pump. Healthy cells maintain organized division through mitochondrial respiration and stable cytomatrix mechanics. In contrast, cancer cells exhibit disordered division due to accelerated glycolysis, enhanced cytomatrix mechanics through actin dynamics, and increased biosynthesis. This imbalance in protein synthesis and the excess ATP production leads to rapid biomass accumulation and increasing cell size, ultimately triggering malignant cell division.

== Alternative models ==
=== Reverse Warburg effect ===
A model called the "reverse Warburg effect" describes cells releasing energy by glycolysis, which are stromal fibroblasts, not tumor cells. In this scenario, the stroma become corrupted by cancer cells and turn into factories for the synthesis of energy rich nutrients. The cells then take these energy rich nutrients and use them for TCA cycle which is used for oxidative phosphorylation. This results in an energy rich environment that allows for replication of the cancer cells. This still supports Warburg's original observation that tumors show a tendency to create energy through aerobic glycolysis.

=== Inverse Warburg effect ===
Another model has been described in tumor cells in an obesity model called Warburg effect inversion. Whereas in the reverse model, the stroma of the microenvironment produces energy-rich nutrients, in a context of obesity these nutrients already exist in the bloodstream and in the extracellular fluid (ECF). In this way, highly energetic nutrients enter directly into TCA and later into oxidative phosphorylation, while lactate and glycogenic amino acids take the opposite path to that proposed by Warburg, which is the production of glucose through the consumption of lactate.

== Cancer metabolism and epigenetics ==
Nutrient use is dramatically altered when cells receive signals to proliferate. Characteristic metabolic changes enable cells to meet the large biosynthetic demands associated with cell growth and division. Changes in rate-limiting glycolytic enzymes redirect metabolism to support growth and proliferation. Metabolic reprogramming in cancer is largely due to the oncogenic activation of signal transduction pathways and transcription factors. Although less understood, epigenetic mechanisms also contribute to the regulation of metabolic gene expression in cancer. Reciprocally, accumulating evidence suggests that metabolic alterations may affect the epigenome. Understanding the relationship between metabolism and epigenetics in cancer cells may open new avenues for anti-cancer strategies.

== Society and culture ==
The Warburg effect has served as a locus of popular misconceptions that cancer can be treated by reducing food and carbohydrate intake to supposedly "starve" tumors. In reality, the health of people with cancer is best served by maintaining a healthy diet.

== See also ==
- Oncometabolism
- Overflow metabolism
