= Crabtree effect =

Biochemical production of ethanol by yeast

The Crabtree effect, named after the English biochemist Herbert Grace Crabtree, describes the phenomenon whereby the yeast, Saccharomyces cerevisiae, produces ethanol (alcohol) in aerobic conditions at high external glucose concentrations rather than producing biomass via the tricarboxylic acid (TCA) cycle, the usual process occurring aerobically in most yeasts e.g. Kluyveromyces spp. This phenomenon is observed in most species of the Saccharomyces, Schizosaccharomyces, Debaryomyces, Brettanomyces, Torulopsis, Nematospora, and Nadsonia genera. Increasing concentrations of glucose accelerates glycolysis (the breakdown of glucose) which results in the production of appreciable amounts of ATP through substrate-level phosphorylation. This reduces the need of oxidative phosphorylation done by the TCA cycle via the electron transport chain and therefore decreases oxygen consumption. The phenomenon is believed to have evolved as a competition mechanism (due to the antiseptic nature of ethanol) around the time when the first fruits on Earth fell from the trees. The Crabtree effect works by repressing respiration by the fermentation pathway, dependent on the substrate.

Ethanol formation in Crabtree-positive yeasts under strictly aerobic conditions was firstly thought to be caused by the inability of these organisms to increase the rate of respiration above a certain value. This critical value, above which alcoholic fermentation occurs, is dependent on the strain and the culture conditions. More recent evidences demonstrated that the occurrence of alcoholic fermentation might not be primarily due to a limited respiratory capacity, but could be caused by a limit in the cellular Gibbs energy dissipation rate.

For S. cerevisiae in aerobic conditions, glucose concentrations below 150 mg/L did not result in ethanol production. Above this value, ethanol was formed with rates increasing up to a glucose concentration of 1000 mg/L. Thus, above 150 mg/L glucose the organism exhibited a Crabtree effect.

It was the study of tumor cells that led to the discovery of the Crabtree effect. Tumor cells have a similar metabolism, the Warburg effect, in which they favor glycolysis over the oxidative phosphorylation pathway.
