= Therapy freedom =

Principle in medical treatment

Therapy freedom is the freedom of physicians to apply whichever therapy their medical knowledge makes them believe to be appropriate. That often means:

1. Physicians have the legal right to prescribe an unlicensed drug. In the 1960s, some of today's drugs considered essential human medicines could be purchased without a prescription. At that time, governments began to impose strict regulations on drugs to ensure the quality of drugs and the effectiveness of treatment. Nowadays, many countries have established drug regulatory agencies. An unlicensed medicine refers to its prescription for use without a marketing authorization issued by the licensing authority of the country. A comprehensive research in Australia, Czech Republic, India, Israel, Italy, Netherlands, Spain, Serbia, Sweden, UK, and USA showed that their rate of prescription (unlicensed medicine) has been reported to range from 0.3 to 35% depending on the country. In many countries, unlicensed therapy should only be prescribed when: no licensed alternative meets the patient's medical necessity and "the clinical benefits are considered to outweigh the potential risks of treatment". Possible restrictions on this issue in each jurisdiction should also be taken into account. From the EU perspective, "if the medical product is provided for “humanitarian reasons to a group of patients suffering from a debilitating and chronic or serious illness or whose disease is considered to be life-threatening” (Article 83, subsection 2 of the EU regulation number 726/2004), it is regarded as a special form, the so called “compassionate use." For example in Italy, the use of the so-called "compassionate use" is foreseen for a medicinal product undergoing clinical trials, outside of the trial itself, in patients suffering from serious or rare diseases or who are in danger of life, when, in the opinion of the doctor, there are no further valid therapeutic alternatives, or in the case in which the patient cannot be included in a clinical trial or, for the purposes of therapeutic continuity, for patients already treated with clinical benefit in the context of a clinical trial of at least phase II concluded. The medicinal product in question must be the subject of an application for marketing authorization or be subjected to trials (Art. 83 paragraph 2 of EC Regulation 726/2004 of the European Parliament and of the Council of 31 March 2004). In Germany, the prescribers have a wide margin of discretion in choosing the therapy that they consider medically necessary. However, they must be guided by the current state of scientific knowledge and exercise due care. The Federal Constitutional Court confirmed this scope in a decision from 2005. From the UK perspective, physicians can prescribe unauthorized drugs, even if they are unlicensed in the UK, in a case if they are licensed elsewhere, or if they have been fabricated in the UK by a certified factory.
2. A health insurance company is obliged to pay for the treatment, regardless of whether or not it considers the treatment to be appropriate. Your health insurer should reimburse medical expenses due to your health insurance package; it would pay the care compensation following the signed health insurance agreement and local restrictions on this issue in each jurisdiction.

Therapy freedom, however, is limited to cases of no treatment existing that is both well-established and more efficacious.

Therapy freedom is established in Germany, where it is known as Therapiefreiheit.
