= Issels treatment =

Alternative cancer treatment

The Issels treatment, or Issels combination therapy, is an alternative cancer treatment based on the ideas of Josef Issels. The treatment is considered ineffective against cancer by the American Cancer Society, and is listed as a "dubious treatment" by the alternative medicine watchdog website Quackwatch.

== Details ==
In Issels combination therapy, patients are asked to remove any teeth containing metal fillings, to follow a strict diet, and to eliminate various substances, such as alcohol and caffeine, which are considered harmful. The treatment makes use of holistic and orthomolecular principles, utilizing certain specialized vaccines, chelation and enzymatic therapies, along with nutraceutical supplementation, such as amigdalyn and vitamin C. The treatment is not approved in the United Kingdom, nor is it approved by any medical society in the United States, but is available worldwide at a reported cost, in 2005, of US$65,000 (or about £45,000).

== See also ==
- List of unproven and disproven cancer treatments
