= Warburg element =

Electrical impedance which models diffusion in dieletric spectroscopy

The Warburg diffusion element is an equivalent electrical circuit component that models the diffusion process in dielectric spectroscopy. That element is named after German physicist Emil Warburg.

A Warburg impedance element can be difficult to recognize because it is nearly always associated with a charge-transfer resistance (see charge transfer complex) and a double-layer capacitance, but is common in many systems. The presence of the Warburg element can be recognised if a linear relationship on the log of a Bode plot (log |Z| vs. log ω) exists with a slope of value –1/2.

== General equation ==
The Warburg diffusion element (Z_{W}) is a constant phase element (CPE), with a constant phase of 45° (phase independent of frequency) and with a magnitude inversely proportional to the square root of the frequency by:

$${Z_\mathrm{W}} = \frac{A_\mathrm{W}}{\sqrt{\omega}}+\frac{A_\mathrm{W}}{j\sqrt{\omega}}$$

$${|Z_\mathrm{W}|} = \sqrt{2}\frac{A_\mathrm{W}}{\sqrt{\omega}}$$

where

- A_{W} is the Warburg coefficient (or Warburg constant);
- j is the imaginary unit;
- ω is the angular frequency.

This equation assumes semi-infinite linear diffusion, that is, unrestricted diffusion to a large planar electrode.

== Finite-length Warburg element ==
If the thickness of the diffusion layer is known, the finite-length Warburg element is defined as:

$${Z_\mathrm{O}} = \frac{1}{Y_0} \tanh\left(B \sqrt{j\omega}\right)$$

where $B=\tfrac{\delta}{\sqrt{D}},$

where $\delta$ is the thickness of the diffusion layer and D is the diffusion coefficient.

There are two special conditions of finite-length Warburg elements: the Warburg Short (W_{S}) for a transmissive boundary, and the Warburg Open (W_{O}) for a reflective boundary.

=== Warburg Short (W_{S}) ===
This element describes the impedance of a finite-length diffusion with transmissive boundary. It is described by the following equation:

$$Z_{W_\mathrm{S}} = \frac{A_\mathrm{W}}{\sqrt{j\omega}} \tanh \left(B \sqrt{j\omega}\right)$$

=== Warburg Open (W_{O}) ===
This element describes the impedance of a finite-length diffusion with reflective boundary. It is described by the following equation:

$$Z_{W_\mathrm{O}} = \frac{A_\mathrm{W}}{\sqrt{j\omega}} \coth\left(B \sqrt{j\omega}\right)$$
