= Warburg effect inversion =

The inversion to the Warburg effect is a corollary to the Warburg hypothesis or Warburg effect that was discovered in obesity. Warburg's hypothesis suggests that tumor cells proliferate quickly and aggressively by obtaining energy or ATP, through high glucose consumption and lactate production. When tumor cells are found in an obesity environment, the researchers perceive that the cells instead of consuming glucose in glycolysis produce glucose through gluconeogenesis using as substrates the lactate that instead of being produced is consumed. The authors explain that this is due to the increase in nutrients that are found in an obese organism and that the cell obtains energy through more caloric nutrients such as fatty acids that are completely oxidized through the Krebs cycle followed by oxidative phosphorylation.
