= Josef Issels =

German physician (1907–1998)

- Born: November 21, 1907; Mönchengladbach, Germany
- Died: February 11, 1998 (aged 90); Rancho Santa Fe, California, U.S.
- Occupation: Physician
- Known for: Promoting the Issels treatment, an unproven alternative treatment for cancer

Josef Maria Issels (November 21, 1907 – February 11, 1998) was a German physician known for promoting an alternative cancer treatment, the Issels treatment. He claimed to cure cancer patients who had been declared incurable by conventional cancer treatments. During Issels' lifetime, his methods were controversial, and in 1961 he was charged with fraud and manslaughter for allegedly promising fraudulent cancer cures and for the subsequent deaths of patients under his care who refused standard cancer treatment. An initial conviction on the manslaughter charge was overturned in 1964 on the grounds that Issels had genuinely believed that his therapy could cure cancer. Since at least 1972 the Issels treatment is described as unproven, and considered ineffective as a treatment for cancer.

== Early life ==
Born in Mönchengladbach in 1907, Issels received his medical degree in 1932 from the University of Würzburg. According to an obituary in the Journal of Alternative and Complementary Medicine, Issels made a name for himself as a young physician several years later by successfully operating in makeshift conditions on an ill passenger aboard a German steamer.

Later, during the Second World War, Issels reportedly petitioned to resign his membership in the Nazi Party when he was ordered to stop treating Jewish patients. His petition was granted, but he was immediately drafted and sent to the Eastern Front as a Wehrmacht combat medic. Captured by the Red Army, Issels spent several years in Soviet prisoner-of-war camps until his release at the end of 1945.

== Issels treatment ==
Issels believed that cancer was caused by the weakening of the human immune system and hence had to be cured by strengthening it again. However, he did not dispute the importance of conventional cancer therapies like surgery and chemotherapy, and did in fact use them when treating his patients. Issels did not advocate a panacea-like new therapy, but rather prescribed various neglected, forgotten, or non-mainstream treatments, such as the Coley vaccine pioneered by William Coley, hyperthermia, where Manfred von Ardenne researched its effectiveness in cancer.

Issels opened his Ringberg Clinic in Bavaria in 1951. As the clinic achieved greater fame, patients from around the world began to seek his treatment. However, other doctors did not approve of his practice, specifically the Bavarian Medical Council, which charged Issels with fraud and manslaughter. After a four-year legal battle, Issels' convictions on all charges were overturned, and his clinic was re-licensed. Issels centers and clinics continue to treat cancer patients around the world, with all types and stages of cancer.

British Olympic medallist Lillian Board and Jamaican musician Bob Marley were treated at his Rottach-Egern clinic for cancer, but both died from the disease.

A review of Issels' claims by the American Cancer Society concluded that there was no evidence that treatment with Issels Combination Therapy or any related treatments were effective against cancer.

== Death and legacy ==
Issels wrote a number of books, including an autobiography in 1981, My Fight Against Cancer, about his understanding of cancer, as well as many scientific articles.

He died of pneumonia at the age of 90. His obituary in the Journal of Alternative and Complementary Medicine described him as the "Father of Integrative Medicine".
