= MetaboLights =

Metabolomics database

Content
- Description: Metabolomics database
- Data types captured: metabolites from different species, metabolite structure, chemical properties, synonyms, experimental protocols, taxonomy, reactions, pathways, NMR spectra, mass spectra

Contact
- Research center: European Molecular Biology Laboratory
- Laboratory: (United Kingdom) European Bioinformatics Institute
- Primary citation: PMID 23109552

Access
- Website: http://www.ebi.ac.uk/metabolights/
- Download URL: http://www.ebi.ac.uk/metabolights/download

Tools
- Web: MetaboLights Website

Miscellaneous
- Data release frequency: live
- Curation policy: Manually curated

MetaboLights is a data repository founded in 2012 for cross-species and cross-platform metabolomic studies that provides primary research data and meta data for metabolomic studies as well as a knowledge base for properties of individual metabolites. The database is maintained by the European Bioinformatics Institute (EMBL-EBI) and the development is funded by Biotechnology and Biological Sciences Research Council (BBSRC). As of July 2018, the MetaboLights browse functionality consists of 383 studies, two analytical platforms, NMR spectroscopy and mass spectrometry.

Semantic annotation is based on various ontologies and controlled vocabularies, including the BRENDA tissue ontology and the NCBI taxonomy. The metabolite structure data is linked to chemical databases, including ChemSpider, PubChem, and ChEBI. Links to metabolite databases, however, seem to be missing.

MetaboLights consists of two components:

- a repository, that enables the metabolomic community to share experimental findings, data and protocols for any metabolomic study. (Fig. 1-2)

Fig.2 MetaboLights Study Protocol

- a reference layer of individual metabolite compounds and their reference spectra including additional information on their biological roles, locations, concentrations and raw data from metabolomic experiments. (Fig. 3)

Fig.3 Metabolite Page

== Scope and access ==
The data stored in MetaboLights is available for download from an FTP site and can be reused by the scientific community, where data sharing is considered an integral part of the scientific method. Copyright and license information, however, is not easily identifiable.

MetaboLights includes user tools for submission of experiments using the ISA-TAB format for metadata tagging of all submissions. Submitted studies are automatically assigned a stable unique accession number (e.g. MTBLS1) that can be used as a publication reference; MetaboLights is one of the repositories recommended by several scientific journals, including EMBO Journal and Nature's Scientific Data. There is also a guided submission process to help meet the Metabolomics Standards Initiative (MSI) recommendations for high quality data submissions for NMR and MS experiments.
