= Wartburg (disambiguation) =

The Wartburg is a castle overlooking the town of Eisenach, Germany.

Wartburg may also refer to:

== Places ==
- Wartburgkreis, a district in Germany
- Wartburg, Illinois, a suburb of Saint Louis, Missouri, United States
- Wartburg, Tennessee, a city in Morgan County, Tennessee, United States
- Wartburg, Ontario, Canada
- Wartburg, KwaZulu-Natal, a town in KwaZulu-Natal Province, South Africa

== Organizations ==
- Wartburg College, a Lutheran college in Waverly, Iowa, and Denver, Colorado
- Wartburg Adult Care Community, in Mount Vernon, New York
- Wartburg Theological Seminary, a Lutheran seminary in Dubuque, Iowa

== Other uses ==
- Wartburg (marque), former East German brand of automobiles, manufactured in Eisenach
