= Lumiflavin =

Names
- Preferred IUPAC name 7,8,10-Trimethylbenzo[g]pteridine-2,4(3H,10H)-dione
- Other names Lumilactoflavin

Identifiers
CAS Number	1088-56-8
3D model (JSmol)	Interactive image
ChEBI	CHEBI:43661
ChemSpider	59571
DrugBank	DB04726
ECHA InfoCard	100.012.841
PubChem CID	66184
UNII	4M2669414M
CompTox Dashboard (EPA)	DTXSID10148745
- InChI: InChI=1S/C13H12N4O2/c1-6-4-8-9(5-7(6)2)17(3)11-10(14-8)12(18)16-13(19)15-11/h4-5H,1-3H3,(H,16,18,19) Key: KPDQZGKJTJRBGU-UHFFFAOYSA-N; InChI=1/C13H12N4O2/c1-6-4-8-9(5-7(6)2)17(3)11-10(14-8)12(18)16-13(19)15-11/h4-5H,1-3H3,(H,16,18,19) Key: KPDQZGKJTJRBGU-UHFFFAOYAD
- SMILES: O=C2/N=C\1/N(c3cc(c(cc3/N=C/1C(=O)N2)C)C)C

Properties
Chemical formula	C_{13}H_{12}N_{4}O_{2}
Molar mass	256.265 g·mol^{−1}
- Except where otherwise noted, data are given for materials in their standard state (at 25 °C [77 °F], 100 kPa). verify (what is ?) Infobox references

Lumiflavin is a toxic product of photolysis of vitamin B_{2}.
