= ChEBI =

Chemical database and ontology of molecular entities

Chemical Entities of Biological Interest (ChEBI)

Content
- Description: Chemical database
- Data types captured: Small chemical compounds

Contact
- Research center: European Molecular Biology Laboratory (European Union)
- Laboratory: European Bioinformatics Institute (United Kingdom)
- Primary citation: Malik et al

Access
- Website: www.ebi.ac.uk/chebi/
- Download URL: ftp.ebi.ac.uk/pub/databases/chebi/
- Web service URL: www.ebi.ac.uk/chebi/backend/api/docs/
- Sparql endpoint: BIO2RDF

Tools
- Web: www.ebi.ac.uk/chebi/

Miscellaneous
- Data release frequency: monthly
- Curation policy: Manually curated

Chemical Entities of Biological Interest, also known as ChEBI, is a chemical database and ontology of molecular entities focused on "small" chemical compounds, that is part of the Open Biomedical Ontologies (OBO) effort at the European Bioinformatics Institute (EBI). The term "molecular entity" refers to any "constitutionally or isotopically distinct atom, molecule, ion, ion pair, radical, radical ion, complex, conformer, etc., identifiable as a separately distinguishable entity". The molecular entities in question are either products of nature or synthetic products which have potential bioactivity. Molecules directly encoded by the genome, such as nucleic acids, proteins and peptides derived from proteins by proteolytic cleavage, are not as a rule included in ChEBI.

ChEBI uses nomenclature, symbolism and terminology endorsed by the International Union of Pure and Applied Chemistry (IUPAC) and nomenclature committee of the International Union of Biochemistry and Molecular Biology (NC-IUBMB).

== Scope and access ==
All data in the database is non-proprietary or is derived from a non-proprietary source. It is thus freely accessible and available to anyone. In addition, each data item is fully traceable and explicitly referenced to the original source. It is related in scope to other databases such as ChEMBL, ChemSpider, DrugBank, MetaboLights and PubChem.

ChEBI data is available through a public web application, web services, SPARQL endpoint and downloads.
