= Warburg coefficient =

Diffusion coefficient of ions in solution

The Warburg coefficient (or Warburg constant; denoted A_{W} or σ) is the diffusion coefficient of ions in solution, associated to the Warburg element, Z_{W}. The Warburg coefficient has units of ${\Omega}/\sqrt{\text{seconds}}={\Omega} s^{-1/2}$

The value of A_{W} can be obtained by the gradient of the Warburg plot, a linear plot of the real impedance (R) against the reciprocal of the square root of the angular frequency (${1}/\sqrt{\omega}$). This relation should always yield a straight line, as it is unique for a Warburg.

Alternatively, the value of A_{W} can be found by:

$$A_W={\frac{R T}{An^2F^2\sqrt2}}{\left(\frac{1}{C_\mathrm{O}^b\sqrt{D_\mathrm{O}}}+{\frac{1}{C_\mathrm{R}^b\sqrt{D_\mathrm{R}}}}\right)}=\frac{R T}{An^2F^2\Theta C\sqrt{2D}}$$

where

- R is the ideal gas constant;
- T is the thermodynamic temperature;
- F is the Faraday constant;
- n is the valency;
- D is the diffusion coefficient of the species, where subscripts O and R stand for the oxidized and reduced species respectively;
- C^{b} is the concentration of the O and R species in the bulk;
- C is the concentration of the electrolyte;
- A denotes the surface area;
- Θ denotes the fraction of the O and R species present.

The equation for A_{W} applies to both reversible and quasi-reversible reactions for which both halves of the couple are soluble.
