= 2-Deoxy-D-glucose =

2-Deoxy-d-glucose
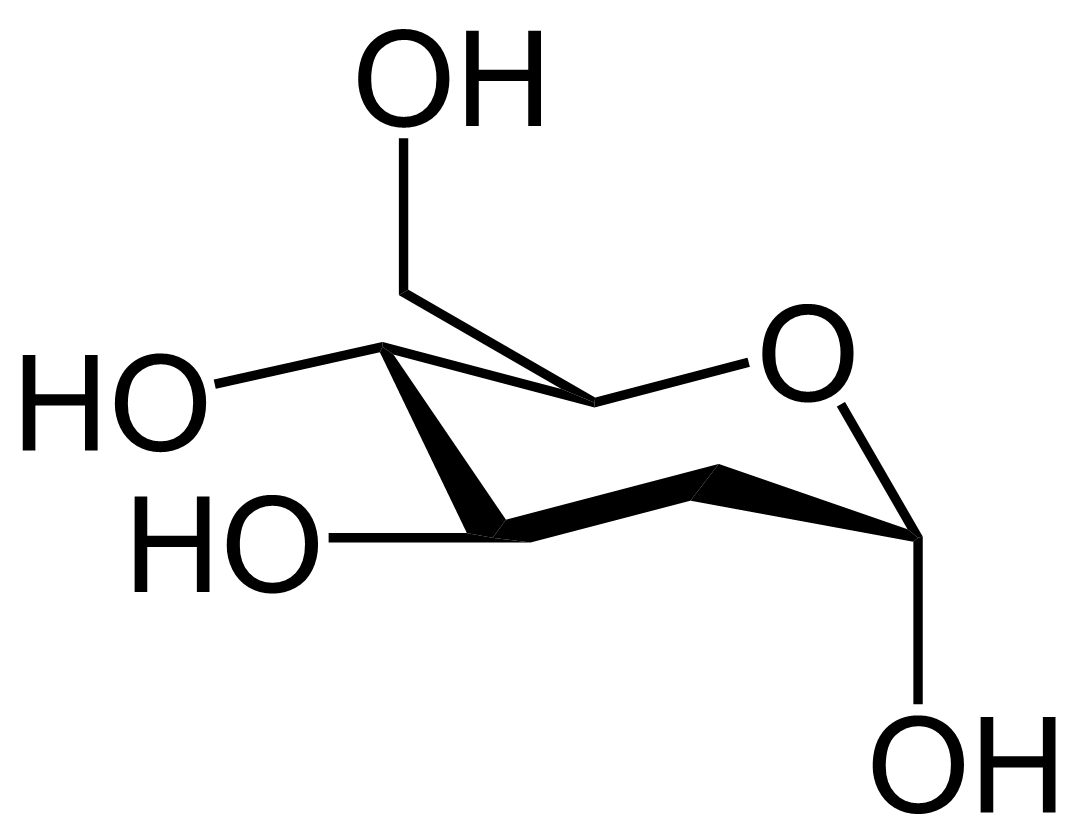
- 2-Deoxy-D-glucose

Names
- IUPAC name 2-Deoxy-D-arabino-hexose
- Systematic IUPAC name (3R,4S,5R)-3,4,5,6-Tetrahydroxyhexanal
- Other names 2-Deoxyglucose; 2-Deoxy-d-mannose; 2-Deoxy-d-arabino-hexose; 2-DG

Identifiers
CAS Number	154-17-6
3D model (JSmol)	Interactive image
ChEMBL	ChEMBL2074932
ChemSpider	388402
ECHA InfoCard	100.005.295
EC Number	205-823-0
IUPHAR/BPS	4643
PubChem CID	108223
UNII	9G2MP84A8W
CompTox Dashboard (EPA)	DTXSID1037648
- InChI: InChI=1S/C6H12O5/c7-2-4-6(10)3(8)1-5(9)11-4/h3-10H,1-2H2/t3-,4-,5?,6+/m1/s1 Key: PMMURAAUARKVCB-CERMHHMHSA-N
- SMILES: O[C@H](C(CO)O[C@H](O)C1)[C@H]1O

Properties
Chemical formula	C_{6}H_{12}O_{5}
Molar mass	164.16 g/mol
Melting point	142 to 144 °C (288 to 291 °F; 415 to 417 K)
- Except where otherwise noted, data are given for materials in their standard state (at 25 °C [77 °F], 100 kPa). verify (what is ?) Infobox references

2-Deoxy-d-glucose is a glucose molecule which has the 2-hydroxyl group replaced by hydrogen, so that it cannot undergo further glycolysis. As such; it acts to competitively inhibit the production of glucose-6-phosphate from glucose at the phosphoglucoisomerase level (step 2 of glycolysis). 2-Deoxyglucose labeled with tritium or carbon-14 has been a popular ligand for laboratory research in animal models, where distribution is assessed by tissue-slicing followed by autoradiography, sometimes in tandem with either conventional or electron microscopy.

2-DG is up taken by the glucose transporters of the cell. Therefore, cells with higher glucose uptake, for example tumor cells, have also a higher uptake of 2-DG. Since 2-DG hampers cell growth, its use as a tumor therapeutic has been suggested, and in fact, 2-DG is in clinical trials. It is not completely clear how 2-DG inhibits cell growth. The fact that glycolysis is inhibited by 2-DG, seems not to be sufficient to explain why 2-DG treated cells stop growing. A synergistic effect between 2-DG and various other agents have been reported in the pursuit of anticancer strategies. Because of its structural similarity to mannose, 2DG has the potential to inhibit N-glycosylation in mammalian cells and other systems, and as such induces ER stress and the Unfolded Protein Response (UPR) pathway.

== Use in optical imaging ==
2-DG has been used as a targeted optical imaging agent for fluorescent in vivo imaging. In clinical medical imaging (PET scanning), fluorodeoxyglucose is used, where one of the 2-hydrogens of 2-deoxy-D-glucose is replaced with the positron-emitting isotope fluorine-18, which emits paired gamma rays, allowing distribution of the tracer to be imaged by external gamma camera(s). This is increasingly done in tandem with a CT function which is part of the same PET/CT machine, to allow better localization of small-volume tissue glucose-uptake differences.

== Indian adoption for COVID-19 treatment ==
On May 8, 2021, the Drugs Controller General of India approved an oral formulation of 2-deoxy-D-glucose for emergency use as adjunct therapy in moderate to severe coronavirus patients. The drug was developed by the DRDO along with Dr. Reddy's Laboratories, who jointly claimed via a press release, that the drug "helps in faster recovery of hospitalised patients and reduces supplemental oxygen dependence". The Wire as well as The Hindu noted that the approval was based on poor evidence; no journal publication (or preprint) concerning efficacy and safety are yet available.

== See also ==
- COVID-19 misinformation
- Fluorouracil
