= Warburg effect (plant physiology) =

Biological phenomenon

In plant physiology, the Warburg effect is the decrease in the rate of photosynthesis due to high oxygen concentrations. Oxygen is a competitive inhibitor of carbon dioxide fixation by RuBisCO which initiates photosynthesis. Furthermore, oxygen stimulates photorespiration which reduces photosynthetic output. These two mechanisms working together are responsible for the Warburg effect.
