= List of people from New York City =

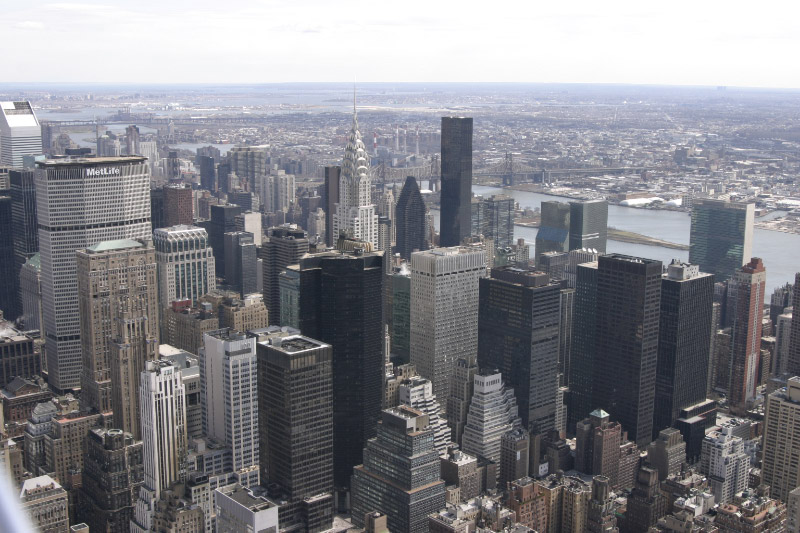
New York City skyline

Many notable people have been born in New York City or have adopted it as their home.

== People from New York City ==
=== 0–9 ===
- 22Gz (Jeffrey Mark Alexander, born 1997) – rapper
- 40 Cal. (Calvin Byrd, born 1979) – rapper
- 50 Cent (Curtis Jackson, born 1975) – businessman and rapper
- 6ix9ine (Daniel Hernandez, born 1996) – rapper

=== A ===
- Aaliyah (Aaliyah Haughton, 1979–2001) – singer, actress and model
- Quinton Aaron (born 1984) – actor
- Bud Abbott (1897–1974) – actor and comedian
- Diahnne Abbott (born 1945) – actress
- Zaid Abdul-Aziz (born 1946) – professional basketball player
- Kareem Abdul-Jabbar (born 1947) – basketball player
- George Abernethy (1807–1877) – first provisional governor of Oregon
- Cecile Abish (born 1930) – sculptor
- Oday Aboushi (born 1991) – football player
- Herb Abrams (1955–1996) – professional wrestling promoter, founder of UWF
- J. J. Abrams (born 1966) – film director and producer
- Jon Abrahams (born 1977) – actor
- Ray Abruzzo (born 1954) – actor
- Bella Abzug (1920–1998) – congressional representative
- Jane Actman (1949–2018) – actress
- Ad-Rock (Adam Horovitz, born 1966) – rapper and musician, member of Beastie Boys
- Brooke Adams (born 1949) – actress
- Eric Adams (born 1960) – former mayor of New York City
- Nana Kwame Adjei-Brenyah (born 1991) – author
- Pamela Adlon (born 1966) – actress
- Garnett Adrain (1815–1878) – member of the United States House of Representatives from New Jersey
- Cornelius Rea Agnew (1830–1888) – ophthalmologist
- Eliza Agnew (1807–1883) – Presbyterian missionary
- Chris Agoliati (born 1951) – soccer player
- Christina Aguilera (born 1980) – singer
- Kamal Ahmed (born 1966) – comedian, member of The Jerky Boys
- Danny Aiello (1933–2019) – actor
- AJR (born 1990, 1994, and 1997) – indie pop trio and multi-instrumentalists
- Kenny Albert (born 1968) – sportscaster
- Marv Albert (born 1941) – sportscaster
- Steve Albert (born 1952) – sportscaster
- Eva Allen Alberti (1856–1938) – dramatics teacher
- Alan Alda (born 1936) – actor
- Beatrice Alda (born 1961) – actress
- Robert Alda (1914–1986) – actor
- Anne Reeve Aldrich (1866–1892) – writer
- Ira Aldridge (1805–1867) – stage actor
- Flex Alexander (born 1970) – actor and comedian
- Khandi Alexander (born 1957) – dancer, choreographer and actress
- William Alexander, Lord Stirling (1726–1783) – major general in the American Revolutionary War
- Davi Alexandre (born 2007) – soccer player
- Nadia Ali (born 1980) – singer
- Sadam Ali (born 1988) – boxer
- Nancy Allen (born 1950) – actress
- Rae Allen (1926–2022) – actress
- Woody Allen (born 1935) – film director, actor and screenwriter
- Jeff Alm (1968–1993) – NFL player
- Vincent Alo (1904–2001) – mobster
- Daniella Alonso (born 1978) – actress
- Rafer Alston (born 1976) – basketball player
- Carol Alt (born 1961) – actress and model
- Jose Alvarado (born 1998) – NBA player
- Trini Alvarado (born 1967) – actress
- Fernando Álvarez (born 2003) – soccer player
- Lyle Alzado (1949–1992) – NFL player
- Hamisi Amani-Dove (born 1974) – soccer player
- Lee J. Ames (1921–2011) – illustrator and writer; known for the Draw 50... learn-to-draw books
- Nicholas Ammeter (born 2000) – soccer player
- Eva Amurri (born 1985) – actress
- Trey Anastasio (born 1964) – rock musician, member of Phish
- John Andariese (1938–2017) – sports broadcaster
- Kenny Anderson (born 1970) – professional basketball player
- Natalie and Nadiya Anderson (born 1986) – twins, television personalities; contestants on The Amazing Race and winner of Survivor: San Juan del Sur
- Tige Andrews (1920–2007) – actor
- Michael Angarano (born 1987) – actor
- Charles Anthon (1797–1867) – classical scholar
- Carmelo Anthony (born 1984) – NBA player
- Cole Anthony (born 2000) – NBA player
- Kiyan Anthony (born 2007) – basketball player
- La La Anthony (born 1982) – actress and television personality
- Marc Anthony (born 1968) – singer, actor
- Judd Apatow (born 1967) – producer, director, comedian, actor and screenwriter
- Jacob Appel (born 1973) – short story writer, bioethicist, born in New York City
- Carmine Appice (born 1946) – drummer, member of Vanilla Fudge and Cactus
- Vinny Appice (born 1957) – drummer, member of Black Sabbath and Dio
- Fiona Apple (born 1977) – singer-songwriter
- Diane Arbus (1923–1971) – photographer
- Arcángel (born 1985) – rapper, singer-songwriter
- Nate Archibald (born 1948) – professional basketball player
- Victor Argo (1934–2004) – actor
- Luis Argudo (born 1995) – soccer player
- Alan Arkin (1934–2023) – actor
- Chris Armas (born 1972) – soccer player
- Alison Arngrim (born 1962) – actress
- Edward Arnold (1890–1956) – actor
- Darren Aronofsky (born 1969) – filmmaker
- Rosanna Arquette (born 1959) – actress
- Lisa Arrindell (born 1969) – actress
- Kenneth J. Arrow (1921–2017) – economist; recipient, 1972 Nobel Memorial Prize in Economic Sciences
- Ron Artest III (born 1999) – basketball player
- Beatrice Arthur (1922–2009) – actress
- Bob Arum (born 1931) – boxing promoter
- Marilyn Aschner (born 1948) – professional tennis player
- William Asher (1921–2012) – film and television director and producer
- William H. Aspinwall (1807–1875) – railroad promoter
- Bob Aspromonte (born 1988) – MLB player
- Ari Aster (born 1986) – filmmaker
- John Jacob Astor III (1822–1890) – businessman, member of the Astor family
- John Jacob Astor VI (1912–1992) – socialite and businessman, member of the Astor family
- Vincent Astor (1891–1959) – businessman and philanthropist, member of the Astor family
- William Backhouse Astor, Sr. (1792–1875) – businessman, member of the Astor family
- William Backhouse Astor Jr. (1829–1892) – businessman, racehorse owner, and yachtsman, member of the Astor family
- Teddy Atlas (born 1956) – boxing trainer and commentator
- René Auberjonois (1940–2019) – actor
- Rich Aurilia (born 1971) – MLB player
- Jake T. Austin (born 1994) – actor, model and writer
- Hassan Ayari (born 2002) – soccer player
- AZ (Anthony Cruz, born 1972) – rapper
- Hank Azaria (born 1964) – actor

=== B ===
- Edwin Burr Babbitt (1862–1939) – actor
- Lauren Bacall (1924–2014) – actress
- Morena Baccarin (born 1979) – Brazilian-born actress
- Johnny Bach (1924–2016) – professional basketball player and coach
- Sosie Bacon (born 1992) – actress
- Joey Badass (Jo-Vaughn Scott, born 1995) – rapper
- Jane Badler (born 1953) – actress
- Mohamed Bahi (born 1983/1984) – American-Algerian former chief liaison of New York City Mayor Eric Adams to the Muslim community
- Emma Bailey (1910–1999) – auctioneer and author
- Adrienne Bailon-Houghton (born 1983) – actress and singer
- Scott Baio (born 1960) – actor
- Fay Baker (1917–1987) – actress
- Nicholson Baker (born 1957) – novelist and essayist
- William Bliss Baker (1859–1886) – landscape artist
- Folarin Balogun (born 2001) – soccer player who represented the United States national team and England at a youth level
- James Baldwin (1924–1987) – writer
- Martin Balsam (1919–1996) – actress
- Talia Balsam (born 1959) – actress
- Azealia Banks (born 1991) – rapper, singer-songwriter, and actress
- Lloyd Banks (born 1982) – rapper
- Joseph Barbera (1911–2006) – animator, producer, director, MGM and co-founder of Hanna-Barbera
- Ellen Barkin (born 1954) – actress
- Erick Barkley (born 1978) – NBA player
- Iran Barkley (born 1960) – boxer
- Saquon Barkley (born 1997) – NFL player
- Salvatore Barone (born 1995) – soccer player
- Dana Barron (born 1966) – actress
- Anna Baryshnikov (born 1992) – actress
- Rocco Basile (1968–2022) – philanthropist
- Jean-Michel Basquiat (1960–1988) – artist
- Angela Bassett (born 1958) – actress
- Arun Basuljevic (born 1995) – soccer player
- Bryan Bautista – Dominican-American musician, singer, and contestant
- Dick Bavetta (born 1939) – NBA referee
- Willow Bay (born 1963) – television host and journalist
- Abraham Beame (1906–2001) – mayor of New York City
- Allyce Beasley (born 1951) – actress
- Bonnie Bedelia (born 1948) – actress
- Daniel Bedoya (born 1994) – soccer player
- Earl Beecham (born 1965) – football player
- Zazie Beetz (born 1991) – actress
- Francesca Beghe (born 1957) – singer-songwriter
- Joy Behar (born 1942) – comedian and television host
- Harry Belafonte (1927–2023) – singer-songwriter, activist, actor
- Jordan Belfort (born 1962) – former stockbroker, financial criminal and author of The Wolf of Wall Street
- Bo Belinsky (1936–2001) – Major League Baseball player
- Aisha Tandiwe Bell – mixed media artist
- Lake Bell (born 1979) – actress
- Frank Bello (born 1965) – musician, member of Anthrax
- Charlie Benante (born 1962) – musician, member of Anthrax
- Laura Benanti (born 1979) – actress
- Pat Benatar (born 1953) – singer
- Wilfred Benítez (born 1958) – boxer
- Tony Bennett (1926–2023) – jazz singer and musician
- Michael Bentt (born 1965) – boxer and actor
- Berry Berenson (1948–2001) – actress and model
- Marisa Berenson (born 1947) – actress and model
- Lillie Berg (1845–1896) – musician, musical educator
- Moe Berg (1902–1972) – Major League Baseball player and spy
- Milton Berle (1908–2002) – comedian
- Paul Berlenbach (1901–1985) – light heavyweight boxing champion, 1925–1926
- Pavel Bermondt-Avalov (1877–1973) – Russian-Georgian military officer and warlord
- Julissa Bermudez (born 1983) – actress and television host
- Walter Berry (born 1964) – basketball player
- Dellin Betances (born 1988) – Major League Baseball pitcher
- Gary Bettman (born 1952) – commissioner of the NHL
- Acid Betty (born 1977) – drag queen
- Mario Biaggi (1917–2015) – decorated policeman and US congressman
- Big Daddy Kane (Antonio Hardy, born 1968) – rapper
- Big L (Lamont Coleman, 1974–1999) – rapper
- Big Pun (Christopher Rios, 1971–2000) – rapper
- Peter Billingsley (born 1971) – actor and filmmaker
- Gus Birney (born 1999) – actress
- Ed Bishop (1932–2005) – actor
- Raymond Ward Bissell (1936–2019) – art historian
- Azriel Blackman (1925–2026) – airline mechanic
- Rolando Blackman (born 1959) – basketball player
- David Blaine (born 1973) – magician
- William Peter Blatty (1928–2017) – author and filmmaker
- Yasmine Bleeth (born 1968) – actress
- Mary J. Blige (born 1971) – singer
- Henry H. Bliss (1830–1899) – first recorded person to be killed by a traffic collision in the United States
- Joan Blondell (1906–1979) – actress
- Richard Blumenthal (born 1946) – U.S. senator for Connecticut
- Alonzo Bodden (born 1962) – actor and comedian
- Humphrey Bogart (1899–1957) – actor
- Sheila Bond (1927–2017) – actress and singer
- Bobby Bonilla (born 1963) – MLB player
- William T. Bonniwell Jr. – Wisconsin and Minnesota politician
- A Boogie wit da Hoodie (Artist Dubose, born 1995) – rapper
- Murray Bookchin (1921–1986) philosopher, historian, activist
- Elayne Boosler (born 1952) – comedian
- Joseph Borelli (born 1982) – politician, conservative commentator
- Michelle Borth (born 1978) – actress
- Francis Bouillon (born 1975) – NHL player
- John Boulos (1921–2002) – soccer player and National Soccer Hall of Fame inductee
- Matthew Bouraee (born 1988) – soccer player
- Anthony Bourdain (1956–2018) – chef, author and television host
- Riddick Bowe (born 1967) – boxer
- Barbara Boxer (born 1940) – U.S. senator from California
- Kate Parker Scott Boyd (1836–1922) – artist, journalist, temperance worker
- Terrence Boyd (born 1991) – soccer player
- William Boylan (1869–1940) – first president of Brooklyn College
- Lucy Boynton (born 1994) – actress
- Lorraine Bracco (born 1954) – actress
- James J. Braddock (1905–1974) – boxer (aka "Cinderella Man")
- Kate J. Brainard (1835–1918) – musical educator
- Hermann Braun (1918–1945) – actor
- Scooter Braun (born 1981) – businessman, talent manager and record executive
- Sam Breadon (1876–1949) – president and owner of the St. Louis Cardinals
- Mike Breen (born 1961) – sports commentator
- Mark Breland (born 1963) – boxer
- Johnny Brennan (born 1961) – comedian, member of The Jerky Boys
- Abigail Breslin (born 1996) – actress and musician
- Jimmy Breslin (1930–2017) – columnist
- Spencer Breslin (born 1992) – actor and musician
- Fanny Brice (1891–1951) – actress, comedian and singer
- Shannon Briggs (born 1971) – boxer
- Ella Bright (born 2006) – actress
- Richard Bright (1937–2006) – actor
- Danielle Brisebois (born 1969) – actress and singer
- Eben Britton (born 1987) – football player
- Matthew Broderick (born 1962) – actor and singer
- Action Bronson (born 1983) – rapper
- Larry Brooks (1950–2025) – sports journalist
- Mel Brooks (born 1926) – film director, screenwriter, actor
- Dario Brose (born 1970) – soccer player, coach, and 1992 Olympian
- Ames T. Brown – Adjutant General of New York
- Helen Gilman Noyes Brown – philanthropist
- Julia Brown – madam and prostitute
- Larry Brown (born 1940) – basketball player and coach
- Quincy Brown (born 1991) – actor
- Tarell Brown (born 1985) – football player
- Andrew Bryson (1822–1892) – United States Navy rear admiral
- William F. Buckley Jr. (1925–2008) – author and conservative commentator
- Sidney Jonas Budnick (1921–1994) – abstract artist
- Daniel Bukantz (1917–2008) – four-time Olympic fencer
- David Bullock (born 1960) – serial killer known as "The .38 Caliber Killer"
- Brooke Bundy (born 1944) – actress
- Cara Buono (born 1971) – actress
- Kareem Burke (born 1974) – record executive, co-founder of Roc-A-Fella Records
- Robert John Burke (born 1960) – actor and firefighter
- Catherine Burns (1945–2019) – actress
- Edward Burns (born 1968) – actor and filmmaker
- George Burns (1896–1996) – comedian
- Ursula Burns (born 1958) – businesswoman, former CEO of Xerox
- John Buscema (1927–2002) – comic book artist
- Sal Buscema (1936–2026) – comic book artist
- Steve Buscemi (born 1957) – actor
- Benjamin Busch – U.S. Marine lieutenant colonel and actor
- Jon Busch (born 1976) – soccer player
- Barbara Bush (1925–2018) – wife of George H. W. Bush
- James Butler (born 1972) – boxer
- Red Buttons (1919–2006) – actor and comedian
- Tom Byer (born 1960) – soccer player, coach, and writer
- Gene Byrnes (1889–1974) – cartoonist

=== C ===
- James Caan (1940–2022) – actor
- Flávio Cabral (1916–1990) – muralist
- Adolph Caesar (1933–1986) – actor
- Leslie Cagan (born 1947) – activist and writer
- James Cagney (1899–1986) – actor
- Jeanne Cagney (1919–1984) – actress
- Eddie Cahill (born 1978) – actor
- Edward L. Cahn (1899–1963) – film director known for the Our Gang comedies
- Sammy Cahn (1913–1993) – lyricist, musician and songwriter
- Bobby Caldwell (1951–2023) – singer
- Sarth Calhoun – electronic musician
- Joseph A. Califano (born 1931) – secretary of Health, Education, and Welfare
- Maria Callas (1923–1977) – Greek-American opera singer
- Northern Calloway (1948–1990) – actor
- Cher Calvin (born 1974) – journalist
- Héctor Camacho (1962–2012) – boxer
- Héctor Camacho Jr. (born 1978) – boxer
- Richard Camacho – singer, musician, member of Latin music band CNCO, Dominican-origin
- Anthony Camal – judo practitioner
- Christian Camargo (born 1971) – actor
- Brandon Cambridge (born 2002) – soccer player
- Knox Cameron (born 1983) – soccer player
- Sean Cameron (born 1985) – soccer player who represented the Guyana national team
- Schuyler V. Cammann (1912–1991) – anthropologist
- Cam'ron (Cameron Giles, born 1976) – rapper
- Jeimer Candelario (born 1993) – baseball player
- Jake Cannavale (born 1995) – actor and musician
- Dina Cantin (born 1972) – television personality (The Real Housewives of New Jersey)
- Eddie Cantor (1982–1964) – comedian, actor, singer and dancer
- Chris Canty (born 1982) – football player
- Capone (Kiam Holley, born 1976) – rapper
- Al Capone (1899–1947) – Prohibition gangster, boss of Chicago Outfit
- Mae Capone (1897–1986) – wife of Al Capone
- Francis Capra (born 1983) – actor
- Jennifer Capriati (born 1976) – tennis player
- Irene Cara (1959–2022) – singer-songwriter, dancer, actress
- Nestor Carbonell (born 1967) – actor
- Cardi B (Belcalis Almánzar, born 1992) – rapper
- Benjamin Cardozo (1870–1938) – associate justice of the U.S. Supreme Court
- Michael A. Cardozo (born 1941) – corporation counsel
- Hugh Carey (1919–2011) – governor of New York
- Timothy Carey (1929–1994) – actor
- George Carlin (1937–2008) – comedian
- Emily Carmichael (born 1982) – filmmaker
- Alan Carney (1909–1973) – actor, comedian
- Caleb Carr (born 1955) – novelist, military historian
- Eric Carr (1950–1991) – rock musician, songwriter
- John Carradine (1906–1988) – actor
- Máximo Carrizo (born 2008) – soccer player
- T. K. Carter (1956–2026) – actor
- Vinnie Caruana (born 1979) – musician, singer
- David Caruso (born 1956) – actor
- Julian Casablancas (born 1978) – lead singer of rock band The Strokes; musician
- Desiree Casado (born 1985) – actress
- Colin Cassady (born 1986) – professional wrestler
- John Cassavetes (1929–1989) – actor
- Katherine Cassavetes (1906–1983) – actress
- Nick Cassavetes (born 1959) – actor and filmmaker
- Gabriel Casseus (born 1972) – actor
- DJ Cassidy (Cassidy Podell, born 1981) – DJ, record producer, MC
- David Cassidy (1950–2017) – actor and singer
- Jack Cassidy (1927–1976) – actor and singer
- Santiago Castaño (born 1995) – soccer player
- Richard S. Castellano (1933–1988) – actor
- Luis Castillo (born 1983) – football player
- Phoebe Cates (born 1963) – actress
- Miles Caton (born 2005) – actor
- Chris Cattaneo (born 1957) – soccer player
- Jose Ceballos – trade unionist, political campaign manager
- Marie Celeste (1875–1954) – soprano, actress, socialite, and philanthropist
- Kai Cenat (born 2001) – YouTuber
- Bennett Cerf (1898–1971) – publisher, television personality
- Billy Cesare (born 1955) – American football player
- Stanley Chais (1926–2010) – investment advisor in the Madoff investment scandal
- Pauline Chalamet (born 1992) – actress
- Timothée Chalamet (born 1995) – actor
- Julian Champagnie (born 2001) – NBA player
- Justin Champagnie (born 2001) – NBA player
- Jeff Chandler (1918–1961) – actor
- Frank Chanfrau (1824–1884) – actor
- Stockard Channing (born 1944) – actress
- James S. C. Chao (born 1927) – Chinese-American entrepreneur, philanthropist
- Harry Chapin (1942–1981) – singer-songwriter
- Steve Chapin (born 1946) – singer-songwriter
- Tom Chapin (born 1945) – singer-songwriter, actor, host of Make A Wish
- Tina Charles (born 1988) – WNBA player
- Roz Chast (born 1954) – cartoonist
- Paddy Chayefsky (1923–1981) – author
- Maury Chaykin (1949–2010) – actor
- Danny Chen (1992–2011) – soldier
- Sylvia Chen – children's author
- Sheila Cherfilus-McCormick (born 1979) – U.S. representative for Florida
- Edmund A. Chester (1897–1973) – executive at CBS
- Dominic Chianese (born 1931) – actor
- Chino XL (Derek Barbosa, 1974–2024) – rapper
- Wendy Choo (Karen Yu, born 1992) – professional wrestler
- Robert Christgau (born 1942) – music journalist
- Thom Christopher (1940–2024) – actor
- Andreas Chronis (born 1989) – soccer player
- Jennie Jerome Churchill (1854–1921) – mother of Winston Churchill
- Hansol Vernon Chwe – singer (member of pop group Seventeen)
- Michael Cimino (1939–2016) – film director, film producer and screenwriter
- Peter Cincotti (born 1983) – singer-songwriter
- Lou Cioffi (born 1957) – soccer player
- Andre Cisco (born 2000) – NFL safety for the Jacksonville Jaguars
- Karen Civil (born 1984) – music Executive and marketing strategist
- Gil Clancy (1922–2011) – boxing trainer and analyst
- Felicia Buttz Clark (1862–1931) – writer
- Yvette Clarke (born 1964) – U.S. representative for New York
- Andrew Dice Clay (born 1957) – actor and comedian
- Jill Clayburgh (1944–2010) – actress
- Ellen Cleghorne (born 1965) – actress and comedian
- Robert Clohessy (born 1957) – actor
- Sam Coffey (born 1998) – soccer player for the United States national team
- Donald Cogsville (born 1965) – soccer player who represented the United States national team
- Ben Cohen (born 1951) – businessman, entrepreneur and activist, co-founder of Ben & Jerry's
- Evan Cole (born 1961) – CEO of H.D. Buttercup
- Kim Coles (born 1962) – actress
- Schuyler Colfax Jr. (1823–1885) – former vice president of the United States
- Margaret Colin (born 1958) – actress
- Willie Colón (born 1950) – salsa musician, social activist
- King Combs (born 1998) – rapper and model, son of Sean Combs
- Sean Combs (born 1969) – rapper
- Elvis Comrie (born 1959) – soccer player who represented the United States national team
- Jeff Conaway (1950–2011) – actor
- Didi Conn (born 1951) – actress
- Jennifer Connelly (born 1970) – actress
- Irv Constantine (1907–1966) – football player
- Lola Consuelos (born 2001) – singer and songwriter
- Evan Conti (born 1993) – American-Israeli basketball player and coach
- Hugh E. Conway (born 1942) – labor economist
- Terence Cooke (1921–1983) – seventh archbishop of New York
- Gerry Cooney (born 1956) – boxer
- Anderson Cooper (born 1967) – television journalist
- George H. Cooper (1821–1891) – United States Navy rear admiral
- Lilli Cooper (born 1990) – actress and singer
- Shaun Cooper (born 1980) – rock musician, bassist
- Lillian Copeland (1904–1964) – Olympic discus champion; set world records in discus, javelin, and shot put
- Francis Ford Coppola (born 1939) – film director, screenwriter, and producer
- Catherine Corcoran – actress
- Karla Cornejo Villavicencio – writer
- Kevin Corrigan (born 1969) – actor
- Howard Cosell (1918–1995) – sportscaster
- William R. Cosentini – mechanical engineer and founder of Cosentini Associates
- Richard Cottingham (born 1946) – serial killer known as "The Torso Killer" and "The Times Square Ripper"
- Ann Coulter (born 1961) – conservative commentator, writer
- Freddie Crawford (born 1941) – basketball player
- Elvis Crespo (born 1971) – singer
- Peter Criss (born 1945) – rock musician, songwriter
- Randy Cross (born 1954) – NFL player
- Jon Cryer (born 1965) – actor
- Billy Crystal (born 1948) – comedian, actor, director
- George Cukor (1899–1983) – film director
- Kieran Culkin (born 1982) – actor
- Kit Culkin (born 1944) – actor
- Macaulay Culkin (born 1980) – actor
- Rory Culkin (born 1989) – actor
- Anthony Cumia (born 1961) – radio personality, host of Opie and Anthony
- Jermaine Cunningham (born 1988) – football player
- Andrew Cuomo (born 1957) – governor of New York
- Mario Cuomo (1932–2015) – governor of New York
- Lee Curreri (born 1961) – actor and musician
- Quentin Curry (born 1972) – landscape painter
- Valerie Curtin (born 1945) – actress, screenwriter
- Tony Curtis (1925–2010) – actor
- Ann Cusack (born 1961) – actress
- Dick Cusack (1925–2003) – actor and filmmaker
- Joan Cusack (born 1962) – actress

=== D ===
- Mike D (Michael Diamond, born 1965) – rapper and musician, member of Beastie Boys
- Nia DaCosta (born 1989) – film director and writer
- Yaya DaCosta (born 1982) – actress and model
- Alexandra Daddario (born 1986) – actress
- Matthew Daddario (born 1987) – actor
- Chester Dale (1883–1962) – banker
- Robert Daley (1930-2026) - writer, author, journalist, police officer
- Robert Dalva (1942–2023) – filmmaker, editor
- Charles Patrick Daly (1816–1899) – judge
- Tim Daly (born 1956) – actor
- Al D'Amato (born 1937) – politician
- Cus D'Amato (1908–1985) – boxing manager and trainer
- Stuart Damon (1937–2021) – actor
- Claire Danes (born 1979) – actress
- Rodney Dangerfield (1921–2004) – comedian
- Lloyd Daniels (born 1967) – basketball player
- William Daniels (born 1927) – actor
- Paul Dano (born 1984) – actor
- Ron Dante (born 1945) – singer-songwriter, record producer
- Tony Danza (born 1951) – actor
- Dapper Dan (Daniel Day, born 1944) – fashion designer
- Georgine Darcy (1933–2004) – actress and dancer
- Bobby Darin (1936–1973) – singer-songwriter, entertainer, actor
- Candy Darling (1944–1974) – actress and Warhol superstar
- Tony Darrow (born 1938) – actor
- Damon Dash (born 1971) – record executive, co-founder of Roc-A-Fella Records
- Drita D'Avanzo (born 1976) – television personality (Mob Wives)
- Jim David (born 1954) – comedian, actor, playwright
- Jonathan David (born 2000) – soccer player who represented the Canada national team
- Keith David (born 1956) – actor
- Larry David (born 1947) – actor, writer, comedian, producer
- Aqil Davidson (AKA A-Plus, born 1972) – rapper, member of Wreckx-n-Effect
- Pete Davidson (born 1993) – actor, comedian
- Marion Davies (1897–1961) – actress
- Aaron Davis (born 1967) – boxer
- Al "Bummy" Davis (1920–1945) – boxer
- Clive Davis (1932–2026) – A&R and record executive
- Larry Davis (1966–2008) – convicted murderer who was infamously acquitted of a shootout with the New York City Police Department
- Sammy Davis Jr. (1925–1990) – singer, entertainer
- Dawin (full name Dawin Polanco; born 1990) – hip hop-R&B singer, musician, record producer
- Rosario Dawson (born 1979) – actress
- Bill Day (born 1959) – filmmaker
- Charlie Day (born 1976) – actor
- Clarence Day (1874–1935) – author and humorist
- Dorothy Day (1897–1980) – Catholic social activist
- Lillian Day (1893–1991) – author and playwright
- Hal de Becker (1931–2021) – dancer and dance writer
- Bill de Blasio (born 1961) – mayor of New York City
- De La Ghetto (born 1984) – singer, rapper, songwriter, model
- Drea de Matteo (born 1972) – actress
- Robert De Niro (born 1943) – actor
- Suzanne de Passe (born 1946) – television, music and film producer
- Melissa De Sousa (born 1967) – actress
- Éamon de Valera (1882–1975) – taoiseach (prime minister) and president of Ireland
- Laura Dean (born 1963) – actress
- Ruby Dee (1922–2014) – actress
- Philip DeFranco (born 1985) – YouTuber and video blogger
- Lana Del Rey (born 1985) – singer-songwriter
- Vanessa del Rio (born 1952) – pornographic actress
- Dana Delany (born 1956) – actress
- Samuel R. Delany (born 1942) – author and critic
- Don DeLillo (born 1936) – author
- Michael DeLorenzo (born 1959) – actor, dancer and director
- Dom DeLuise (1933–2009) – actor and comedian
- Aaron T. Demarest (1841–1908) – carriage manufacturer
- Travis Demeritte (born 1994) – MLB player
- Ted Demme (1963–2002) – film and television director, creator of Yo! MTV Raps
- Derek Dennis (born 1988) – football player
- Jerry Denny (1859–1927) – Major League Baseball player
- Desiigner (Sidney Selby III, born 1997) – rapper
- C.C. DeVille (born 1962) – guitarist, member of Poison
- Willy DeVille (1950–2009) – singer
- Kevin Devine (born 1979) – musician, songwriter
- Rosemarie DeWitt (born 1971) – actress
- Artie Diamond – boxer
- Neil Diamond (born 1941) – singer, composer
- Melonie Diaz (born 1984) – actress
- John DiBartolomeo (born 1991) – American-Israeli basketball player in the Israeli Basketball Premier League
- Carola Dibbell (born 1945) – music journalist
- Janice Dickinson (born 1955) – model and television personality
- Vin Diesel (born 1967) – actor
- Bo Dietl (born 1950) – media personality and member of Homeland Security Advisory Council, former NYPD detective and private investigator
- August Dietrich (1858–unknown) – member of the Wisconsin State Assembly
- Maximilian Dietz (born 2002) – professional soccer player
- Paul Dini (born 1957) – writer, animator and comic book artist
- Chris Distefano (born 1984) – comedian
- Dagmara Domińczyk (born 1976) – actress
- Marika Domińczyk (born 1980) – actress
- Byron Donalds (born 1978) – U.S. representative for Florida
- Meg Donnelly (born 2000) – actress, singer, dancer
- Richard Donner (1930–2021) – filmmaker
- Vincent D'Onofrio (born 1959) – actor
- Shaun Donovan (born 1966) – former U.S. secretary of Housing and Urban Development and director of the Office of Management and Budget, candidate in the 2021 New York City Democratic mayoral primary
- Jim Dooley (born 1976) – composer
- Irvin Dorfman (1924–2006) – tennis player
- Phoebe Doty – prostitute and madam
- Doug E. Doug (born 1970) – actor
- Amanda Minnie Douglas (1831–1916) – writer
- Kirk Douglas (1916–2020) – actor
- Robert Downey Jr. (born 1965) – actor, producer, singer
- Robert Downey Sr. (1936–2021) – filmmaker
- Ervin Drake (1919–2015) – composer, producer, writer, musician
- DreamDoll (Tabatha Robinson, born 1992) – rapper
- Fran Drescher (born 1957) – actor
- Richard Dreyfuss (born 1947) – actor
- Eric Drooker – artist, illustrator
- Jim Drucker (born 1952/1953) – former commissioner of the Continental Basketball Association, former commissioner of the Arena Football League, and founder of NewKadia Comics
- Jack Drury (born 2000) – NHL player
- Heather Dubrow (born 1969) – reality television personality (The Real Housewives of Orange County)
- David Duchovny (born 1960) – actor
- Bubba Ray Dudley (Mark LoMonaco, born 1971) – professional wrestler
- Patty Duke (1946–2016) – actress, activist for mental-health issues
- Allen B. DuMont (1901–1965) – electronics engineer, scientist, inventor, and founder of the DuMont Television Network
- Lena Dunham (born 1986) – actress, screenwriter, producer, director
- Griffin Dunne (born 1955) – film producer
- Joseph Dunninger (1892–1975) – mentalist
- Don Dunphy (1908–1998) – sports commentator
- Bryant Dunston (born 1986) – American-Armenian basketball player
- Richard Dupont (born 1968) – artist
- Jimmy Durante (1893–1980) – actor and pianist
- Lou Duva (1922–2017) – boxing manager and trainer
- Jakob Dylan (born 1969) – singer
- Alexis Dziena (born 1984) – actress

=== E ===
- Daisy Eagan (born 1979) – actress
- Dominique Easley (born 1992) – football player
- Charles Ebbets (1859–1925) – sports executive, former owner of the Brooklyn Dodgers
- Gertrude Ederle (1905–2003) – competition swimmer, first woman to swim across English channel
- Dean Edwards (born 1970) – comedian and actor
- Steve Edwards (born 1948) – news anchor
- Eddie Egan (1930–1995) – police detective
- Gladys Egan (1900–1985) – child actress
- Billy Eichner (born 1978) – actor
- Rich Eisen (born 1969) – sportscaster and radio host
- Jesse Eisenberg (born 1983) – actor
- Ned Eisenberg (1957–2022) – actor
- Will Eisner (1917–2005) – cartoonist and writer, co-founder of Eisner & Iger
- Ansel Elgort (born 1994) – actor, singer, dancer, DJ
- Arthur Elgort (born 1940) – photographer
- Sophie Elgort (born 1986) – photographer
- Paula Eliasoph (1895–1983) – painter, printmaker
- Mario Elie (born 1963) – basketball player
- Lapo Elkann (born 1977) – chief executive officer, Fiat
- Bill Elko (born 1959) – football player
- Duke Ellington (1899–1974) – jazz pianist
- Abby Elliott (born 1987) – actress
- Chris Elliott (born 1960) – actor
- Margaret Dye Ellis (1845–1925) – social reformer, lobbyist
- Velena G. Ellis (1914–1971) – attorney and police officer
- Albert Elsen (1927–1995) – art historian
- Emily Engstler (born 2000) – WNBA player
- Jack Entratter (1914–1971) – business executive, former general manager of the Copacabana and Sands Hotel and Casino
- DJ Envy (RaaShaun Casey, born 1977) – DJ and radio personality
- Nora Ephron (1941–2012) – director, screenwriter, author
- Omar Epps (born 1973) – actor
- Mark Epstein (born 1954) – property developer, brother of Jeffrey Epstein
- Jeffrey Epstein (1953–2019) – financier and convicted child sex offender
- Theo Epstein (born 1973) – formerly the youngest general manager in MLB, currently president of Baseball Operations for the Chicago Cubs
- Eru (Jo Seong-hyeon, born 1983) – singer
- Giancarlo Esposito (born 1958) – actor
- Jennifer Esposito (born 1973) – actress
- Susie Essman (born 1955) – actress
- Emilio Estevez (born 1962) – actor
- Ramon Estevez (born 1963) – actor
- Renée Estevez (born 1967) – actress
- Erik Estrada (born 1949) – actor
- Etika (Desmond Amofah, 1990–2019) – YouTuber, streamer
- Christine Evangelista (born 1986) – actress

=== F ===
- Fabolous (John David Jackson, born 1977) – rapper
- Peter Facinelli (born 1973) – actor
- Douglas Fairbanks Jr. (1909–2000) – actor
- Donald Faison (born 1974) – actor
- Edie Falco (born 1963) – actress
- Jonah Falcon (born 1970) – actor and writer; achieved fame in early 2000s for his penis size
- Peter Falk (1927–2011) – actor
- Jimmy Fallon (born 1974) – comedian
- Tali Farhadian – former federal prosecutor; candidate for New York County district attorney
- Steve Farhood (born 1957) – boxing historian and analyst, former editor-in-chief of The Ring
- Louis Farrakhan (born 1933) – leader of the Nation of Islam
- Perry Farrell (born 1959) – musician
- Joey Fatone (born 1977) – singer, member of NSYNC
- Jon Favreau (born 1966) – actor and filmmaker
- Alice Faye (1915–1998) – actress
- Charles Fazzino (born 1955) – pop artist
- Harry Feldman (1919–1962) – Major League Baseball pitcher
- Jack Feldman – lyricist
- Kurt Feldman (born 1984) – musician, composer, producer and multi-instrumentalist
- Morton Feldman (1926–1987) – composer
- José Feliciano (born 1945) – musician
- Vanessa Ferlito (born 1977) – actress
- Abel Ferrara (born 1951) – filmmaker
- Jerry Ferrara (born 1979) – actor
- Barbie Ferreira (born 1996) – actress (Euphoria)
- Julissa Ferreras (born 1976) – New York City Council Member, Finance Committee chair
- Lou Ferrigno (born 1951) – bodybuilder and actor
- Richard Feynman (1918–1988) – theoretical physicist; recipient 1965 Nobel Prize in Physics
- Kim Fields (born 1969) – actress
- Harvey Fierstein (born 1952) – actor and playwright
- Bill Finger (1914–1974) – comic book writer, co-creator of Batman
- Shelly Finkel (born 1944) – boxing promoter and manager
- Bobby Fischer (1943–2008) – chess grandmaster
- Hamilton Fish (1808–1893) – governor of New York and U.S. secretary of state
- Dominique Fishback (born 1991) – actress
- Langston Fishburne (born 1988) – actor
- Laurence Fishburne (born 1961) – actor
- Mickey Fisher (1904/05–1963) – basketball coach
- Greg Fitzsimmons (born 1966) – comedian
- Herbert Flam (1928–1980) – tennis player
- Waka Flocka Flame (Juaquin Malphurs, born 1986) – rapper
- Bobby Flay (born 1964) – chef and television personality
- Tom Fleischman (born 1951) – sound engineer
- Chuck Fleischmann (born 1962) – U.S. representative for Tennessee
- Susan Fleming (1908–2002) – actress, wife of Harpo Marx
- Jeffrey Flier (born 1948) – dean of Harvard Medical School
- Kay Flock (born 2003) – rapper
- Jim Florentine (born 1964) – comedian, actor and television personality
- Brian Flores (born 1981) – NFL coach
- Jane Fonda (born 1937) – actress
- Peter Fonda (1940–2019) – actor
- Hector Fonseca (born 1980) – DJ
- Malcolm Forbes (1919–1990) – publisher
- Davy Force (1849–1918) – major league baseball player
- Whitey Ford (1928–2020) – pitcher for the New York Yankees
- Andrew Form (born 1969) – film producer
- John Forsythe (1918–2010) – actor
- William Forsythe (born 1955) – actor
- Vito Fossella (born 1965) – borough president of Staten Island and U.S. representative for New York
- Jorja Fox (born 1968) – actress
- Virginia Foxx (born 1943) – U.S. representative for North Carolina
- Nikolai Fraiture (born 1978) – bassist of rock band The Strokes, musician
- Anthony Franciosa (1928–2006) – actor
- Frankee (Nicole Spinelli, born 1983) – singer
- David Frankel (born 1959) – film director
- Lois Frankel (born 1948) – U.S. representative for Florida
- Al Franken (born 1951) – comedian and radio host, U.S. senator from Minnesota
- Helen Frankenthaler (1928–2011) – abstract painter
- Michael Franzese (born 1951) – former mobster, internet personality
- Michael Freeman – inventor, entrepreneur, author, and business consultant
- Ace Frehley (1951–2025) – guitarist
- Doug E. Fresh (born 1966) – musician
- Jack Friedman (1939–2010) – businessman, founder of LJN, THQ and Jakks Pacific
- Laura Friedman (born 1966) – U.S. representative for California
- Milton Friedman (1912–2006) – economist
- Eric Fromm (born 1958) – tennis player
- John Frusciante (born 1970) – guitarist, member of Red Hot Chili Peppers

=== G ===
- Michael Gandolfini (born 1999) – actor
- Luis García Jr. – baseball player
- Gus Gardella (1895–1974) – football player
- Eliza Ann Gardner (1831–1922) – abolitionist
- Alex Garfin (born 2004) – actor
- Art Garfunkel (born 1941) – singer-songwriter, actor
- Julia Garner (born 1994) – actress
- Shad Gaspard (1981–2020) – professional wrestler
- Lexa Gates – musician and rapper
- Joe Gatto (born 1976) – comedian
- Rudy Gay (born 1986) – NBA player
- David Geffen (born 1943) – record executive and film producer
- Lou Gehrig (1903–1941) – MLB player
- Sarah Michelle Gellar (born 1977) – actress
- Michael Gelman (born 1961) – television producer and actor
- Natalie Gelman (born 1985) – singer/songwriter
- Richard Genelle (1961–2008) – actor
- Marie George (1876–1955) – actress and singer
- George Gershwin (1898–1937) – composer
- Ira Gershwin (1896–1983) – lyricist
- Vitas Gerulaitis (1954–1994) – tennis player
- Tiffany Giardina (born 1993) – singer-songwriter
- Debbie Gibson (born 1970) – singer
- Justin Gignac (born 1981) – artist
- Ray Gillen (1959–1993) – singer, member of Badlands and Black Sabbath
- Lawrence Gilliard Jr. (born 1971) – actor
- Betty Gilpin (born 1986) – actress
- Ruth Bader Ginsburg (1933–2020) – associate justice of U.S. Supreme Court
- Issamar Ginzberg – business strategist, rabbi, motivational speaker
- Greg Giraldo (1965–2010) – comedian
- Rudolph Giuliani (born 1944) – mayor of New York City
- Robin Givens (born 1964) – actress
- Charles V. Glasco – New York City police sergeant, known for his efforts to rescue John William Warde in 1938
- Ilana Glazer (born 1987) – actress and comedian
- Jackie Gleason (1916–1987) – comedian, actor
- James Gleason (1882–1959) – actor
- Joel Glucksman (born 1949) – Olympic fencer
- Ros Gold-Onwude (born 1987) – sports broadcaster
- Whoopi Goldberg (born 1955) – comedian, actress, television personality
- William Goldberg (1925–2003) – diamond dealer
- Daniel S. Goldin (born 1940) – NASA director
- Danielle Goldstein (born 1985) – American-Israeli show jumper
- Leon M. Goldstein (died 1999) – president of Kingsborough Community College, and acting chancellor of the City University of New York
- Ben Goldwasser (born 1982) – member of the psychedelic-rock band MGMT
- Minetta Good (1895–1946) – painter and printmaker
- Richard Goode (born 1943) – classical pianist
- Cuba Gooding Jr. (born 1968) – actor
- Cuba Gooding Sr. (1944–2017) – singer
- Doris Kearns Goodwin (born 1943) – author
- Leo Gorcey (1917–1969) – film actor and comedian, leader of the Dead End Kids, East Side Kids, and Bowery Boys in several movies
- Jared Gordon (born 1988) – mixed martial artist
- Kyle Gordon (born 1992) – comedian, singer, and YouTuber
- Robert A. Gorman (born 1937) – law professor at the University of Pennsylvania Law School
- Eydie Gorme (1928–2013) – singer
- Karen Lynn Gorney (born 1945) – actress
- Louis Gossett Jr. (1936–2024) – actor
- Victor Gotbaum (1921–2015) – labor leader
- Gilbert Gottfried (1955–2022) – comedian and actor
- Irv Gotti (Irving Lorenzo, 1970–2025) – record executive and producer
- John Gotti (1940–2002) – crime boss
- Elliott Gould (born 1938) – actor
- Joan Gould (1927–2022) – author and journalist
- David C. Gowdey (1841–1908) – politician
- Leslie Grace (born 1995) – singer
- Topher Grace (born 1978) – actor
- Sean Grande (born 1969) – television and radio sportscaster
- Lee Grant (born 1925) – actress
- Oliver "Power" Grant (1973–2026) – music executive and actor
- Bonita Granville (1923–1988) – actress and television producer
- F. Gary Gray (born 1969) – filmmaker
- Sammy "The Bull" Gravano (born 1940) – mobster, former underboss of the Gambino crime family
- Renee Graziano (born 1969) – reality television personality (Mob Wives)
- Rocky Graziano (born Thomas Rocco, 1919–1990) – boxer
- Benny Green (born 1963) – pianist
- Hank Greenberg (1911–1986) – Hall of Fame baseball player
- Ariana Greenblatt (born 2007) – actress
- Angela Greene (1921–1978) – actress
- Denny Greene (1949–2015) – singer, member of Sha Na Na
- Milton H. Greene (1922–1985) – fashion and celebrity photographer, film and television producer
- Jerry Greenfield (born 1951) – businessman and philanthropist, co-founder of Ben & Jerry's
- Alan Greenspan (1926–2026) – economist, Federal Reserve chairman
- Sheila Greenwald (born 1934) – author
- Adrian Grenier (born 1976) – actor
- Jennifer Grey (born 1960) – actress
- Bill Griffith (born 1944) – cartoonist (Zippy)
- Melanie Griffith (born 1957) – actress
- Max Grodénchik (born 1952) – actor
- Alfred Grossman (1927–1987) – writer and novelist
- Harry Guardino (1925–1995) – actor
- Alex Guarnaschelli (born 1969) – chef and television personality
- Bob Guccione (1930–2010) – publisher
- Richie Guerin (born 1932) – NBA player and coach
- Peggy Guggenheim (1898–1979) – art collector
- Grace Gummer (born 1986) – actress
- Mamie Gummer (born 1983) – actress
- Rajat Gupta (born 1948) – CEO of McKinsey & Company convicted of insider trading
- Jim Gurfein (born 1961) – tennis player
- Steve Guttenberg (born 1958) – actor
- Luis Guzmán (born 1956) – actor
- Fred Gwynne (1926–1993) – actor
- Maggie Gyllenhaal (born 1977) – actress

=== H ===
- Joan Hackett (1934–1983) – actress
- Ilfenesh Hadera (born 1985) – actress
- Aaron Hall (born 1964) – singer
- Adelaide Hall (1901–1993) – jazz singer, Broadway star, actress
- Anthony Michael Hall (born 1968) – actor
- Huntz Hall (1920–1999) – comedian, actor; co-starred in several Dead End Kids, East Side Kids and Bowery Boys movies
- Jimmy Hall (born 1994) – basketball player in the Israeli National League
- Julian Hall (born 2008) – soccer player
- Mortimer Halpern (1909–2006) – Broadway stage manager
- Julie Halston (born 1954) – actress and comedian
- Eddy Hamel (1902–1943) – Jewish-American soccer player for Dutch club AFC Ajax who was killed by the Nazis in Auschwitz concentration camp
- Pete Hamill (1935–2020) – journalist
- Marvin Hamlisch (1944–2012) – composer
- Armand Hammer (1898–1990) – industrialist and philanthropist
- Oscar Hammerstein II (1895–1960) – composer
- Han Terra (born 1982) – polymath
- Frank Hankinson (1856–1911) – major league baseball player
- Adam Hann-Byrd (born 1982) – actor
- Sean Hannity (born 1961) – television host, author, conservative political commentator
- Nelson Harding (1879–1944) – editorial cartoonist
- Edward W. Hardy (born 1992) – composer, musician and producer
- Maurice Harkless (born 1993) – basketball player
- Donald J. Harlin (1935–2015) – chief of chaplains of the U.S. Air Force
- Andre Harrell (1960–2020) – record executive
- Lynn Harrell (1944–2020) – cellist
- W. Averell Harriman (1891–1986) – diplomat and governor of New York
- Andy Harris (born 1957) – U.S. representative for Maryland
- David Harris (1949–2024) – actor
- Julie Harris (1925–2013) – actress
- Zelda Harris (born 1985) – actress
- Jackée Harry (born 1956) – actress
- Bob Hastings (1925–2014) – actor
- Anne Hathaway (born 1982) – actress
- Marcia Haufrecht (born 1937) – actor, director, playwright
- Richie Havens (1941–2013) – singer-songwriter, guitarist
- Levon Hawke (born 2002) – actor
- Maya Hawke (born 1998) – actress, singer-songwriter and model
- Curt Hawkins (born 1985) – professional wrestler
- Billy Hayes (born 1947) – author of Midnight Express
- Patrick Joseph Hayes (1867–1938) – fifth archbishop of New York
- Susan Hayward (1917–1975) – actress
- Rita Hayworth (1918–1987) – actress
- Shari Headley (born 1964) – actress
- Fred Hechinger (born 1999) – actor
- Anthony Hecht (1923–2004) – poet
- Ladislav Hecht (1909–2004) – Czechoslovak-American tennis player
- Jamie Hector (born 1975) – actor
- Lucas Hedges (born 1996) – actor
- Carol Heiss (born 1940) – Olympic figure skater (silver 1956, gold 1960)
- Joseph Heller (1923–1999) – author
- Alvin Hellerstein (1933–2026) – U.S. federal judge
- Mark Helprin (born 1947) – author
- Susan Hendl (1947–2020) – ballet dancer and répétiteur
- Lance Henriksen (born 1940) – actor
- Buck Henry (1930–2020) – actor and filmmaker
- Nelson H. Henry (1855–1923) – member of the New York State Assembly, adjutant general of New York
- Brian Henson (born 1963) – puppeteer, director, producer
- Jean-Noël Herlin (born 1940) – archivist, antiquarian bookseller, curator
- Jason Hernandez (born 1983) – soccer player who represented the Puerto Rico national team and general manager
- Elinore Morehouse Herrick (1895–1964) – labor–relations specialist
- Bernard Herrmann (1911–1975) – composer
- Robert Hess (1935–2014) – sculptor, art educator
- Peter Cooper Hewitt (1861–1921) – inventor
- Paul Heyman (born 1965) – professional wrestling manager, promoter and commentator
- William Hickey (1927–1997) – actor
- Catherine Hicks (born 1951) – actress
- D'atra Hicks (born 1967) – actress and singer
- Taral Hicks (born 1974) – actress and singer
- Hildegarde (1906–2005) – cabaret singer
- Roger Hill (1949–2014) – actor
- Kathy Hilton (born 1959) – socialite, fashion designer, actress
- Nicky Hilton (born 1983) – socialite, fashion designer, model
- Paris Hilton (born 1981) – socialite, actress
- Gregory Hines (1946–2003) – dancer and actor
- Judd Hirsch (born 1935) – actor
- Jack Hirschman (1933–2021) – poet and social activist
- Camomile Hixon (born 1970) – visual artist
- Julius Hodge (born 1983) – basketball player and coach
- William E. Hoehle – member of the Wisconsin State Assembly
- Steven Hoffenberg (1945–2022) – businessman and convicted fraudster
- Cooper Hoffman (born 2003) – actor
- Robert Hofstadter (1915–1990) – physicist and Nobel laureate
- Eleanor Holm (1912–2004) – competitive swimmer, 1932 Olympic gold medalist
- Eric Holtz (born 1965) – head coach of the Israel National Baseball Team
- Megan Hollingshead (born 1968) – actress, singer, broadway star
- Shaheen Holloway (born 1976) – basketball coach and former player, current head coach of the St. Peter's Peacocks
- Ellen Holly (1931–2023) – actress
- Eli Holzman (born 1974) – writer, producer, and television executive
- Rio Hope-Gund (born 1999) – soccer player
- Lena Horne (1917–2010) – actress and singer
- Edward Everett Horton (1886–1970) – actor
- Jay Horwitz (born 1945) – New York Mets executive
- Curly Howard (1903–1952) – actor of comedy team the Three Stooges
- Moe Howard (1897–1975) – actor of comedy team the Three Stooges
- Shemp Howard (1895–1955) – actor of comedy team the Three Stooges
- Steny Hoyer (born 1939) – U.S. representative for Maryland and House Majority leader
- Tina Huang (born 1981) – actress
- Henry W. Hubbell (1842–1917) – US Army brigadier general
- Sofia Hublitz (born 2000) – actress
- Jon Huertas (born 1969) – actor
- Gregg "Opie" Hughes (born 1963) – radio personality, host of Opie and Anthony
- Richard Hunt (1951–1992) – puppeteer and television director
- Harold Hunter (1974–2006) – professional skateboarder and actor
- Tab Hunter (1931–2018) – actor
- Cornelia Collins Hussey (1827–1902) – philanthropist, writer
- Barbara Hutton (1912–1979) – socialite dubbed "Poor Little Rich Girl"
- Sarah Hyland (born 1990) – actress and singer

=== I ===
- David Iacono (born 2002) – actor
- Scott Ian (born 1963) – guitarist, member of Anthrax
- Raúl Ibañez (born 1972) – MLB player
- Carl Icahn (born 1936) – financier and a special advisor during the Trump administration
- Ice Spice (Isis Gaston, born 2000) – rapper
- Bob Iger (born 1951) – media executive, former CEO of The Walt Disney Company
- Jerry Iger (1903–1990) – cartoonist, co-founder of Eisner & Iger
- Melanie Iglesias (born 1987) – model and actress
- Robert Iler (born 1985) – actor
- Tonya Ingram (1991–2022) – author, poet, and disability rights activist
- Inspectah Deck (Jason Hunter, born 1970) – rapper, member of Wu-Tang Clan
- Jimmy Iovine (born 1953) – record executive and media proprietor
- Washington Irving (1783–1859) – author
- John Isaac – photographer
- Christian Izien (born 2000) – NFL player

=== J ===
- Wolfman Jack (Robert Weston Smith, 1938–1995) – radio personality
- Aziel Jackson (born 2001) – soccer player
- Mark Jackson (born 1965) – basketball player and coach
- Skai Jackson (born 2002) – actress
- Troy "Escalade" Jackson (1973–2011) – basketball player
- Jane Jacobs (1916–2006) – economist, urban theorist, activist
- Karl Jacobs (born 1998) – Youtuber
- Ken Jacobs (born 1933) – artist and filmmaker
- Lawrence Hilton Jacobs (born 1953) – actor
- Marc Jacobs (born 1963) – fashion designer
- Elizabeth Jagger (born 1984) – model, activist, daughter of Mick Jagger and Jerry Hall
- Henry James (1843–1916) – writer
- William James (1842–1910) – philosopher and psychologist
- Brenda Janowitz (born c. 1973) – writer and attorney
- Jaiquawn Jarrett (born 1989) – football player
- Jam Master Jay (1965–2002) – DJ and producer, member of Run-DMC
- John Jay (1745–1829) – diplomat, jurist (including chief justice of the United States) and politician (including governor of New York)
- Jay-Z (Shawn Carter, born 1969) – rapper and businessman
- Jaz-O (Jonathan Burks, born 1964) – rapper
- Karine Jean-Pierre (born 1974) – political campaign organizer
- Hakeem Jeffries (born 1970) – U.S. representative for New York and Democratic leader in the House
- Charles Jenkins (born 1989) – basketball player
- Max Jenkins (born 1985) – actor and writer
- Ron Jeremy (born 1953) – pornographic actor, filmmaker, and comedian
- Jharrel Jerome (born 1997) – actor
- Ty Jerome (born 1997) – professional basketball player
- Jack Jersawitz (1934–2012) – Marxist activist and television host
- Jessi (born 1988) – rapper
- Hugh Jessiman (born 1984) – NHL player
- Jipsta (John Patrick Masterson; born 1974) – rapper
- Billy Joel (born 1949) – singer-songwriter
- David Johansen (1950–2025) – actor and singer-songwriter, member of New York Dolls
- Scarlett Johansson (born 1984) – actress, singer, and producer
- Daymond John (born 1969) – entrepreneur
- Boris Johnson (born 1964) – British politician, prime minister of the United Kingdom, and former mayor of London (2008–2016)
- Crockett Johnson (1906–1975) – cartoonist and children's writer (Harold and the Purple Crayon)
- Jim Jones (born 1976) – rapper and record executive
- Norah Jones (born 1979) – singer-songwriter and actress
- Julia Jones-Pugliese (1909–1993) – national champion fencer and fencing coach
- Spike Jonze (born 1969) – actor and filmmaker
- Michael Jordan (born 1963) – basketball player
- Lazarus Joseph (1891–1966) – New York state senator and New York City comptroller
- Shahadi Wright Joseph (born 2005) – actress
- Colin Jost (born 1982) – comedian, actor, and writer
- William Joyce (also known as Lord Haw-Haw; 1906–1946) – Nazi propaganda broadcaster
- Francine Justa (1942–2016) – activist and affordable housing advocate in New York City

=== K ===
- K7 (Louis Sharpe, born 1966) – rapper and singer
- Qurrat Ann Kadwani (born 1981) – actress and playwright
- Marilyn Kagan (1951–2020) – actress and psychotherapist
- Philip Mayer Kaiser (1913–2007) – U.S. diplomat
- Bob Kaliban (1933–2020) – actor, voice actor, and former president of SAG-AFTRA
- Elena Kampouris (born 1997) – actress
- Bob Kane (1915–1998) – comic book writer and artist, creator of Batman
- Elias Kane (1794–1835) – served as the first Illinois secretary of state 1818–1822; United States senator for Illinois 1825–1835
- Kangol Kid (Shaun Fequiere, 1966–2021) – rapper, member of UTFO
- Chris Kanyon (1970–2010) – professional wrestler\
- Anna Kaplan (born 1985) – New York State Senator
- Gabe Kaplan (born 1945) – actor
- Jonathan Kaplan (1947–2025) – filmmaker
- Donna Karan (born 1948) – fashion designer
- Steve Karsay (born 1972) – MLB player
- Abraham Katz (1926–2013) – diplomat, U.S. ambassador to the OECD
- Michael Katz (1939–2025) – sportswriter
- Jeffrey Katzenberg (born 1950) – media proprietor and film producer
- Andy Kaufman (1949–1984) – actor and comedian
- Charlie Kaufman (born 1958) – screenwriter
- Elaine Kaufman (1929–2010) – restauranteur (Elaine's)
- Michael Kay (born 1961) – sports broadcaster
- Danny Kaye (1911–1987) – actor and comedian
- Lenny Kaye (born 1946) – guitarist
- Thomas Kean (born 1935) – governor of New Jersey
- Monica Keena (born 1979) – actress
- Harvey Keitel (born 1939) – actor
- Kelis (Kelis Rogers, born 1979) – singer
- Max Kellerman (born 1973) – sports analyst
- Kevin Kelley (born 1967) – boxer
- Bridget Kelly (born 1986) – singer
- Moira Kelly (born 1968) – actress
- Robin Kelly (born 1956) – U.S. representative for Illinois
- Alexa Kenin (1962–1985) – actress
- George Kennedy (1925–2016) – actor
- Jacqueline Kennedy (1929–1994) – First Lady of the United States and editor
- John F. Kennedy Jr. (1960–1999) – attorney and magazine publisher, son of John F. Kennedy
- Max Kennedy (born 1965) – writer and lawyer
- Tom Kenny (born 1962) – voice actor and comedian
- Jerome Kern (1885–1945) – composer
- Alicia Keys (born 1981) – singer-songwriter and actress
- Robert Kibbee (1921–1982) – Chancellor of the City University of New York
- Lil' Kim (Kimberly Denise Jones; born 1976) – actress and rapper
- Jimmy Kimmel (born 1967) – comedian and television talk-show host
- King Princess (born 1998) – singer-songwriter
- Carole King (born 1942) – singer-songwriter
- Larry King (1933–2021) – television talk-show and radio host
- Morgana King (1930–2018) – singer and actress
- Keith Kinkaid (born 1989) – professional ice hockey player
- Bruce Kirby (1925–2021) – actor
- Bruno Kirby (1949–2006) – actor
- Jack Kirby (1917–1994) – comic book artist, co-creator of Avengers, Hulk and X-Men
- Lola Kirke (born 1990) – actress and singer
- Sally Kirkland (1941–2025) – actress
- Nancy Kissinger (born 1934) – philanthropist
- Calvin Klein (born 1942) – fashion designer
- Diana Kleiner (born 1947) – art historian
- Greta Kline (born 1994) – singer and musician
- Leni Klum (born 2004) – fashion model
- Christopher Knight (born 1957) – actor
- John "Julius" Knight – music producer, DJ
- Miss Ko (Christine Ko, born 1985) – rapper
- Ed Koch (1924–2013) – mayor of New York City
- E. L. Konigsburg (1930–2013) – writer
- Peter Koo (born 1952) – politician and pharmacist
- Kool G Rap (Nathaniel Wilson, born 1968) – rapper
- C. Everett Koop (1916–2013) – physician
- Tony Kornheiser (born 1948) – host of Pardon the Interruption, sportswriter and columnist
- Yaphet Kotto (1939–2021) – actor
- Sandy Koufax (born 1935) – MLB pitcher
- Martin Kove (born 1946) – actor, known for The Karate Kid franchise as John Kreese in Cobra Kai
- Joey Kramer (born 1950) – drummer, Aerosmith
- Lenny Kravitz (born 1964) – singer-songwriter
- Jill Krementz (born 1940) – author and photographer
- Gary Kreps (born 1952) – health and risk communication scholar
- KRS-One (Lawrence Parker, born 1965) – rapper
- Barbara Kruger (born 1945) – feminist artist
- David Krumholtz (born 1978) – actor
- Stanley Kubrick (1928–1999) – film director and screenwriter
- Bob Kulick (1950–2020) – guitarist
- Bruce Kulick (born 1953) – guitarist
- Clarence Kummer (1899–1931) – U.S. Riding Hall of Fame jockey
- William Kunstler (1919–1995) – lawyer
- Ray Kurzweil (born 1947) – author, inventor, and futurist
- Tony Kushner (born 1956) – playwright and screenwriter
- Kienast quintuplets (born 1970) – quintuplets
- Allan Kwartler (1917–1998) – sabre and foil fencer, Pan American Games and Maccabiah Games champion

=== L ===
- Fiorello La Guardia (1882–1947) – mayor of New York City
- Adrienne La Russa (born 1948) – actress
- Casey LaBow (born 1986) – actress
- Jesse Lacey (born 1978) – musician and singer
- David LaChapelle (born 1963) – photographer
- Lady Gaga (Stefani Joanne Angelina Germanotta, born 1986) – musician and actress
- Sophia Laforteza (born 2002) – singer, dancer, and member of girl group Katseye
- Bert Lahr (1895–1967) – actor and comedian
- Veronica Lake (1922–1973) – actress
- Jake LaMotta (1922–2017) – boxer
- Kenneth Lampl (born 1964) – composer and lecturer
- Burt Lancaster (1913–1994) – actor
- Martin Landau (1928–2017) – actor
- Steve Landesberg (1936–2010) – actor
- Diane Lane (born 1965) – actress
- Don Lane (1933–2009) – talk show host
- Meyer Lansky (1902–1983) – gangster
- Leo Laporte (born 1956) – founder/host of TWiT.tv
- Micah Lasher (born 1981) – New York State Assemblyman
- Floria Lasky (1923–2007) – theater world lawyer
- Sanaa Lathan (born 1971) – actress
- Cyndi Lauper (born 1953) – singer
- Ralph Lauren (born 1939) – fashion designer
- Emma Lazarus (1849–1887) – author and poet
- Blackie Lawless (Steven Duren, born 1956) – singer and guitarist, member of W.A.S.P.
- Gracie Lawrence (born 1997) – actress and singer
- Marc Lawrence (born 1959) – filmmaker
- Steve Lawrence (1935–2024) – singer and actor
- NeNe Leakes (born 1967) – television personality (The Real Housewives of Atlanta)
- Ron Leavitt (1947–2008) – television produced and writer, co-creator of Married... with Children
- Harold Lederman (1940–2019) – boxing judge and analyst
- Ivan Lee (born 1981) – Olympic saber fencer; banned for life by SafeSport
- Jeanette Lee ("The Black Widow", born 1971) – professional pool player
- Malcolm D. Lee (born 1970) – filmmaker
- Peyton Elizabeth Lee (born 2004) – actress
- Spike Lee (born 1957) – filmmaker
- Stan Lee (1922–2018) – comic-book writer, editor, film executive producer, actor, and publisher for Marvel Comics
- Will Lee (1908–1982) – actor (Mr. Hooper on Sesame Street)
- John Leguizamo (born 1960 or 1964) – actor
- Franz Leichter (1930–2023) – politician
- Madeleine L'Engle (1918–2007) – author
- Sean Lennon (born 1975) – musician, son of John Lennon
- Melissa Leo (born 1960) – actress
- Damien Leone (born 1984) – filmmaker, creator of the Terrifier series
- Téa Leoni (born 1966) – actress
- Ken Leung (born 1970) – actor
- Margarita Levieva (born 1980) – actress
- A. Leo Levin (1919–2015) – law professor at the University of Pennsylvania Law School
- Floyd Levine (1932–2025) – actor
- Shlomo Levinger (born 1997) – magician and mentalist
- Al Lewis (1923–2006) – actor
- Huey Lewis (born 1950) – musician and singer
- Joe E. Lewis (1902–1971) – comedian
- Kecia Lewis (born 1965) – actress and singer
- Richard Lewis (1947–2024) – actor and comedian
- Miranda Lichtenstein (born 1969) – artist
- Roy Lichtenstein (1923–1997) – pop artist
- Larry Lieber (born 1931) – comic book artist and writer
- Joe Lieberman (1942–2024) – long-time U.S. senator from Connecticut (1989–2013); 2000 vice presidential nominee under Al Gore
- Chris Lighty (1968–2012) – record executive
- Sophia Lillis (born 2002) - actress
- Hal Linden (born 1931) – actor
- John Lindsay (1921–2000) – mayor of New York City
- Hamish Linklater (born 1976) – actor and playwright
- John Linnell (born 1959) – musician, one half of alternative rock duo They Might Be Giants
- Laura Linney (born 1964) – actress
- Liondub (Erik Weiss; born 1973) – DJ and record producer
- Deborah Lipstadt (born 1947) – historian and author
- Peggy Lipton (1946–2019) – actress
- Lisa Lisa (Lisa Velez, born 1967) – singer, member of Lisa Lisa and Cult Jam
- Peyton List (born 1998) – actress
- Zoe Lister-Jones (born 1982) – actress
- Havana Rose Liu (born 1997) – actress
- John Liu (born 1967) – politician, 43rd New York City comptroller
- Lucy Liu (born 1968) – actress
- Robert R. Livingston (1746–1813) – U.S. founding father and diplomat
- LL Cool J (James Todd Smith, born 1968) – rapper and actor
- Daniel Lobell – stand-up comedian and podcaster
- Tommy Lockhart (1892–1979) – inductee into Hockey Hall of Fame and United States Hockey Hall of Fame
- Robert Loggia (1930–2015) – actor
- Lindsay Lohan (born 1986) – actress and singer
- Vince Lombardi (1913–1970) – NFL coach
- Stacy London (born 1969) – television personality, host of What Not to Wear
- Nia Long (born 1970) – actress
- Mike Longabardi (born 1973) – NBA assistant coach
- Ki Longfellow (1944–2022) – novelist
- Jennifer Lopez (born 1969) – singer and actress
- Lori Loughlin (born 1964) – actress
- Julia Louis-Dreyfus (born 1961) – actress
- Tina Louise (born 1934) – actress
- Evelyn Lozada (born 1975) – model and television personality
- Willie Lozado (born 1959) – baseball player
- Bennet Nathaniel "Nate" Lubell (1916–2006) – Olympic fencer
- Edna Luby (1884–1928) – Broadway and vaudeville performer
- Charles "Lucky" Luciano (1897–1962) – gangster
- Sid Luckman (1916–1998) – football player and coach
- Jenny Lumet (born 1967) – actress and screenwriter
- Sidney Lumet (1924–2011) – film director, producer, and screenwriter
- Justine Lupe (born 1989) – actress
- Frankie Lymon (1942–1968) – singer
- Carol Lynley (1942–2019) – actress
- Natasha Lyonne (born 1979) – actress
- MC Lyte (Lana Moorer, born 1970) – rapper, actress and television announcer

=== M ===
- Remy Ma (Reminisce Smith, born 1980) – rapper
- Peter Maas (1929–2001) – author and journalist
- Lil Mabu (born 2005) – rapper
- Alice Foote MacDougall (1867–1945) – coffee wholesaler, restaurateur, and business owner in the city
- Ali MacGraw (born 1939) – actress
- John F. Mackie (1835–1910) – Medal of Honor recipient
- Lukas MacNaughton (born 1995) – soccer player who represented the Canada national team
- Steve Madden (born 1958) – fashion designer and businessman
- Bernie Madoff (1938–2021) – financier and financial criminal
- Ruth Madoff (born 1941) – wife of Bernie Madoff
- Bill Maher (born 1956) – comedian and television host
- Umber Majeed (born 1989) – visual artist
- Bernard Malamud (1914–1986) – author
- Romany Malco (born 1968) – actor
- Nicole Malliotakis (born 1980) – U.S. representative for New York
- Lil Mama (Niatia Kirkland, born 1989) – rapper and actress
- Zohran Mamdani (born 1991) – mayor of New York City
- Paloma Mami (born 1999) – singer
- Sandro Mamukelashvili (born 1999) – professional basketball player for the San Antonio Spurs
- Melissa Manchester (born 1951) – singer
- Barry Manilow (born 1943) – singer-songwriter
- Arnold Manoff (1914–1965) – screenwriter
- Dinah Manoff (born 1956) – actress
- Mase (Mason Betha, born 1975) – rapper
- Mike Mansfield (1903–2001) – senator from Montana
- Bruce Manson (born 1956) – tennis player
- Charlotte Manson (1917–1996) – radio actress
- Sonia Manzano (born 1950) – actress
- John Mara (born 1954) – businessman, co-owner of the New York Giants
- Stephon Marbury (born 1977) – professional basketball player
- James Margolis (born 1936) – Olympic fencer
- Rose Marie (1923–2017) – actress
- John Marley (1907–1984) – actor
- Dean Marlowe (born 1992) – safety for the Buffalo Bills
- Constantine Maroulis (born 1975) – American Idol finalist
- Garry Marshall (1934–2016) – filmmaker and screenwriter
- Penny Marshall (1943–2018) – actress and filmmaker
- Diane Martel (1962–2025) – music video director
- Ernest Mateen (1966–2012) – boxer
- Christopher "Play" Martin (born 1962) – rapper and actor
- Darnell Martin (born 1964) – filmmaker
- Ernest Martin (born 1932) – theatre director and manager
- Alpo Martinez (1966–2021) – drug lord
- Angie Martinez (born 1971) – radio personality
- Edgar Martínez (born 1963) – MLB player
- Melanie Martinez (born 1995) – singer-songwriter, actress, director, photographer, and screenwriter
- Soraida Martinez (born 1956) – artist and designer
- John Martino (born 1937) – actor
- Sadie Martinot (1861–1923) – singer, actress
- Lee Marvin (1924–1987) – actor
- Chico Marx (1887–1961) – comedian
- Groucho Marx (1890–1977) – member of the Marx Brothers
- Gummo Marx (1892–1977) – member of the Marx Brothers
- Harpo Marx (1888–1964) – member of the Marx Brothers
- Louis Marx (1896–1982) – founder of Louis Marx and Company
- Zeppo Marx (1901–1979) – member of the Marx Brothers
- James Maslow (born 1990) – actor and singer (raised in California)
- Anthony Mason (1966–2015) – NBA player
- John Massari (born 1957) – composer, sound designer
- Ashley Massaro (1979–2019) – professional wrestler
- Alanna Masterson (born 1988) – actress
- Richard Masur (born 1948) – actor–
- Samantha Mathis (born 1970) – actress
- Walter Matthau (1920–2000) – actor
- Sam Mattis (born 1994) – Olympic discus thrower
- Whitman Mayo (1930–2001) – actor, acted on Sanford and Son
- Debi Mazar (born 1964) – actress
- Loretta Mazza (born 1957) – Sammarinese politician, mayor of Acquaviva (2009–2013)
- Margherita Wood McCandlish (1892–1954) – former First Lady of Guam, born in New York City
- Joe McCarthy (born 2001) – rugby union player
- John McCloskey (1810–1885) – cardinal archbishop of New York, 1864–1885
- Frank McCourt (1930–2009) – author (raised in Ireland, returned later in life)
- Malachy McCourt (1931–2024) – author (raised in Ireland, returned later in life)
- Darryl "DMC" McDaniels (born 1964) – rapper, member of Run-DMC
- Ralph McDaniels (born 1959) – radio and television personality, host of Video Music Box
- Oisin McEntee (born 2001) – Irish soccer player
- John C. McGinley (born 1959) – actor
- Allie McGuire (born 1951) – professional basketball player
- Triston McKenzie (born 1997) – MLB pitcher
- Kenneth McMillan (1932–1989) – actor
- Audrey Meadows (1922–1996) – actress
- Anne Meara (1929–2015) – actress and comedian
- Kay Medford (1916–1980) – actress
- Gregory Meeks (born 1953) – U.S. representative for New York
- Paul Meltsner – WPA-era painter and muralist
- Dave Meltzer (born 1959) – pro wrestling journalist
- Herman Melville (1819–1891) – author
- Bob Melvin (born 1961) – Major League Baseball player and manager
- Daniel Menaker (1941–2020) – writer and editor
- Bob Menendez (born 1954) – U.S. senator for New Jersey; the first sitting member of Congress to be convicted of being a foreign agent
- Grace Meng (born 1975) – lawyer and politician, Vice Chair of the Democratic National Committee
- Yehudi Menuhin (1916–1999) – violinist
- Idina Menzel (born 1971) – singer and actress
- Larry Merchant (born 1931) – boxing analyst and sportswriter
- Ethel Merman (1908–1984) – singer and actress
- Helen Merrill (born 1929) – jazz singer
- Jenny B. Merrill (1854–1934) – educator, author
- Robert Merrill (1917–2004) – singer
- Debra Messing (born 1968) – actress
- Art Metrano (1936–2021) – actor
- Dan Meuser (born 1964) – U.S. representative for Pennsylvania
- Dina Meyer (born 1968) – actress
- Robert Miano (born 1942) – actor
- Stefano Miceli (1975) – pianist and conductor
- Al Michaels (born 1944) – sports broadcaster
- Lea Michele (born 1986) – actress and singer
- Vera Michelena (1885–1961) – actress, dancer, and singer
- Dash Mihok (born 1974) – actor
- Alyssa Milano (born 1972) – actress
- Sally Milgrim (1898–1994) – fashion designer
- Adeline Miller (1777–1859) – prostitute and madam
- Arthur Miller (1915–2005) – playwright
- Dick Miller (1928–2019) – actor
- Jarrell Miller (born 1988) – boxer
- Marcus Miller (born 1959) – bassist and composer
- Sienna Miller (born 1981) – actress
- Stephanie Mills (born 1957) – singer, former Broadway star
- Andy Mineo (born 1988) – Christian rapper
- Sal Mineo (1939–1976) – actor
- Rachel Miner (born 1980) – actress
- Marvin Minsky (1927–2016) – cognitive and computer scientist
- Lin-Manuel Miranda (born 1980) – musical theatre writer and performer
- Andrea Mitchell (born 1946) – journalist, NBC News
- John Joseph Mitty (1884–1961) – Roman Catholic Archbishop of San Francisco
- Isaac Mizrahi (born 1961) – fashion designer
- Gerald Mohr (1914–1968) – actor
- Nancie Monelle (1841–1903) – physician, missionary
- Aja Monet (born 1987) – poet
- Eddie Money (1949–2019) – singer
- Lenny Montana (1926–1992) – actor and professional wrestler
- Nicholas Montemarano (born 1970) – writer
- Julie Chen Moonves (born 1970) – television personality
- Davey Moore (1959–1988) – boxer
- Indya Moore (born 1995) – actress
- Mary Tyler Moore (1936–2017) – actress, producer
- Melba Moore (born 1945) – actress, singer
- Michael Moorer (born 1967) – boxer
- Tom Morello (born 1964) – guitarist
- Rita Moreno (born 1931) – actress
- Henry Morgan (1915–1994) – radio and television personality
- Huey Morgan (born 1986) – musician, radio DJ, songwriter, television personality
- Cathy Moriarty (born 1960) – actress
- Erin Moriarty (born 1994) – actress
- Sam Morril (born 1986) – stand-up comedian
- Gouverneur Morris (1752–1816) – U.S. founding father; U.S. senator
- Shelley Morrison (1936–2019) – actress
- Vic Morrow (1929–1982) – actor
- Viggo Mortensen (born 1958) – actor
- Joe Morton (born 1947) – actor
- Zero Mostel (1915–1977) – actor, comedian
- Tommy Mottola (born 1949) – music executive
- DJ Muggs (Lawrence Muggerud, born 1968) – record producer and DJ, member of Cypress Hill
- Eddie Mustafa Muhammad (born 1952) – boxer
- Maria Muldaur (born 1942) – folk and blues singer-songwriter
- John Mulholland – documentary filmmaker, film historian
- Brian Mullen (born 1962) – NHL player
- Joe Mullen (born 1957) – NHL player
- Brennan Lee Mulligan (born 1988) – actor, comedian and gamemaster
- Gerry Mulligan (1927–1996) – musician
- Richard Mulligan (1932–2000) – actor
- Robert Mulligan (1925–2008){ – director
- Thom Michael Mulligan – actor
- Chris Mullin (born 1963) – basketball player
- Charlie Murphy (1959–2017) – actor, comedian
- Chris Murphy (born 1973) – U.S. senator from Connecticut since 2013
- Eddie Murphy (born 1961) – actor, comedian
- James Murray (born 1976) – comedian, actor, author
- Yunus Musah (born 2002) – soccer player
- Bess Myerson (1924–2014) – actress, model and politician

=== N ===
- James M. Nack (1809–1879) – deaf and mute poet
- Jerry Nadler (born 1947) – U.S. representative for New York
- Larry Nagler (born 1940) – tennis player, 1960 NCAA Tennis Singles Champion and Doubles Champion
- Dominic Napolitano (1930–1981) – mafia caporegime
- Janet Napolitano (born 1957) – third U.S. secretary of Homeland Security
- Nas (Nasir Jones, born 1973) – rapper, songwriter, and entrepreneur
- Michael H. Nash (1946–2012) – labor historian, librarian, and archivist
- Tonie Nathan (1923–2014) – Libertarian Party political figure
- Sarah Natochenny (born 1987) – voice actress
- Lia Neal (born 1995) – Olympic swimmer
- Oscar Neebe (1850–1916) – anarchist, labor activist, one of Haymarket bombing trial defendants
- Chuck Negron (1942–2026) – singer, songwriter, founding member of music and rock band Three Dog Night
- Casey Neistat (born 1981) filmmaker, producer, YouTuber
- Haywood Nelson (born 1960) – actor
- Sean Nelson – actor
- Howard Nemerov (1920–1991) – poet
- Sylvester Nevins – politician
- Sam Newfield (1899–1964) – film director
- John Philip Newman (1826–1899) – Methodist bishop
- Pete Nice (born 1967) – rapper, member of 3rd Bass
- Mike Nichols (1931–2014) – comedian, film and theatre director
- Denise Nickerson (1957–2019) – actress
- Harry Nilsson (1941–1994) – singer-songwriter
- Nine (Derrick Keyes, born 1969) – rapper
- Cynthia Nixon (born 1966) – actress
- Joakim Noah (born 1985) – NBA player
- Jerry Nolan (1946–1992) – rock drummer
- John Nolan (born 1978) – musician and singer
- Charles Nordhoff (1830–1901) – journalist, descriptive and miscellaneous writer
- Dagmar Nordstrom (1903–1976) – composer, pianist and singer; member of the cabaret singing duo the Nordstrom Sisters
- Siggie Nordstrom (1893–1980) – actress, model and singer; member of the cabaret singing duo the Nordstrom Sisters
- Ed Norris (born 1960) – radio host
- Chris Noth (born 1954) – actor
- Geoffrey Notkin (born 1961) – television science educator
- The Notorious B.I.G. (Christopher George Latore Wallace, 1972–1997) – rapper
- Miguel A. Núñez Jr. (born 1959) – actor
- Carrie Nye (1936–2006) – actress
- Laura Nyro (1947–1997) – singer-songwriter

=== O ===
- Simon Oakland (1915–1983) – actor
- John Oates (born 1948) – musician, member of Hall & Oates
- Alexandria Ocasio-Cortez (born 1989) – U.S. representative for New York
- Charlie O'Connell (born 1975) – actor
- Jerry O'Connell (born 1974) – actor and television personality
- Carroll O'Connor (1924–2001) – actor
- Susan Louise O'Connor (born 1975) – film, television and stage actress
- Lamar Odom (born 1979) – NBA player
- Al Oerter (1935–2007) – four-time Olympic champion in discus throw
- Kevin Ogletree (born 1987) – NFL player
- Adewale Ogunleye (born 1977) – NFL player
- Virginia O'Hanlon (1889–1971) – school teacher
- Garrick Ohlsson (born 1948) – classical pianist
- Keith Olbermann (born 1959) – television sportscaster and commentator
- Jon Oliva (born 1960) – Savatage singer and keyboardist
- Olivia (born 1981) – singer
- Chris O'Loughlin (born 1967) – Olympic fencer
- Gregory Olsen (born 1945) – entrepreneur
- Patrice O'Neal (1969–2011) – comedian
- Eugene O'Neill (1888–1953) – playwright
- Paul O'Neill (1956–2017) – record producer, lyricist and musician
- Paul O'Neill (1956–2017) – music composer and producer
- Robert Oppenheimer (1904–1967) – physicist; "father of the atomic bomb"
- Jerry Orbach (1935–2004) – actor
- Bill O'Reilly (born 1949) – former Fox News anchor
- Tony Orlando (born 1944) – singer
- Roscoe Orman (born 1944) – actor known for playing Gordon Robinson on Sesame Street
- John Ortiz (born 1968) – actor
- Lisa Ortiz (born 1974) – actress
- Lane Shi Otayonii – musician and interactive multimedia performer
- Adam Ottavino (born 1985) – MLB pitcher
- Daniel Oturu (born 1999) – basketball player for Hapoel Tel Aviv of the Israeli Basketball Premier League
- Rick Overton (born 1954) – actor and comedian

=== P ===
- Al Pacino (born 1940) – actor
- Saul K. Padover (1905–1981) – historian
- Josh Pais (born 1964) – actor
- Alan J. Pakula (1928–1998) – film director, screenwriter, and producer
- Olivia Palermo (born 1986) – fashion influencer, model and socialite
- Adam Pally (born 1982) – actor and comedian
- Joe Palma (1905–1994) – actor and comedian
- Fanny Purdy Palmer (1839–1923) – author, lecturer, activist
- Richie Palacios (born 1997) – MLB player
- Chazz Palminteri (born 1952) – actor
- Joseph Papp (1921–1991) – theater producer, impresario, founder of The Public Theater
- Michael Paré (born 1958) – actor
- Rob Parker (born 1964) – sportswriter, television analyst
- Smush Parker (born 1981) – NBA player
- Cheyenne Parker-Tyus (born 1992) – WNBA player
- Lana Parrilla (born 1977) – actress
- Vincent Pastore (1946-2026) - actor
- Jason Patric (born 1966) – actor
- Glenn Patrick (born 1950) – NHL player
- Pastel Ghost (Vivian Moon) – musician, singer, songwriter, and producer
- Joe Paterno (1928–2012) – football coach
- Floyd Patterson (1935–2006) – boxer
- James Patterson (born 1947) – novelist
- J.N. Pattison (1839–1905) – pianist, composer
- Sarah Paulson (born 1974) – actress
- Allen Payne (born 1968) – actor
- Carl Anthony Payne II (born 1969) – actor
- Alan Robert Pearlman (1925–2019) – engineer, synthesizer manufacturer (ARP Instruments, Inc.)
- Lou Pearlman (1954–2016) – music manager and scam artist, founder of Backstreet Boys and NSYNC
- Josh Peck (born 1986) – actor
- Jordan Peele (born 1979) – actor, comedian and filmmaker
- Jan Peerce (1904–1984) – opera tenor
- Amanda Peet (born 1972) – actress
- Richard Pelham (1815–1876) – blackface performer
- Claiborne Pell (1918–2009) – senator from Rhode Island
- Francis L. Pell (1873–1945) – architect
- Caroline Pennell (born 1996) – singer-songwriter, musician, and contestant on NBC's The Voice season 5
- Anthony Perkins (1932–1992) – actor
- Osgood Perkins (born 1974) – filmmaker and actor
- Sam Perkins (born 1961) – NBA player
- Rhea Perlman (born 1948) – actress
- Ron Perlman (born 1950) – actor
- Harold Perrineau (born 1963) – actor
- Bernadette Peters (born 1948) – actress, singer
- Regis Philbin (1931–2020) – actor, entertainer, television personality, and former host of ABC's Who Wants to Be a Millionaire? (1999–2002) and Live! with Regis and Kelly (1983–2011)
- Todd Phillips (born 1970) – filmmaker
- Irving J. Phillipson (1882–1955) – US Army major general
- Fafà Picault (born 1991) – soccer player who represented the United States national team and Haiti national team
- Justin Pierce (1975–2000) – actor
- Lip Pike (1845–1893) – baseball player, four-time home-run champion
- Bronson Pinchot (born 1959) – actor
- Ed Pinckney (born 1963) – NBA player
- Rick Pitino (born 1952) – basketball coach
- Stacey Plaskett (born 1966) – delegate to the U.S. House of Representatives for the U.S. Virgin Islands
- Galo Plaza (1906–1987) – President of Ecuador
- John Pleshette (born 1942) – actor
- Suzanne Pleshette (1937–2008) – actress
- George Plimpton (1927–2003) – sportswriter
- Ethel McClellan Plummer (1888–1936) – artist
- Dascha Polanco (born 1982) – actress
- Lumi Pollack (born 2009) – actress
- Christopher Poole – creator of websites 4chan and Canvas Networks
- Pop Smoke (Bashar Jackson, 1999–2020) – rapper
- Ted Post (1918–2013) – movie and television director
- Neil Postman (1931–2003) – author, cultural critic
- Chaim Potok (1929–2002) – author
- Bud Powell (1924–1966) – jazz pianist
- Colin Powell (1937–2021) – U.S. Army general and U.S. secretary of state
- Gary Powell (born 1969) – drummer
- Joshua Prager (born 1949) – physician
- Priscilla Presley (born 1945) – actress
- Harold Pressley (born 1963) – NBA player
- Kelly Price (born 1973) – singer
- Damian Priest (Luis Martinez, born 1982) – professional wrestler
- L. Bradford Prince (1840–1922) – politician who was governor of New Mexico Territory
- Prince Royce (born 1989) – singer-songwriter, actor
- Freddie Prinze (1954–1977) – comedian and actor
- Tito Puente (1923–2000) – bandleader
- Mario Puzo (1920–1999) – author

=== Q ===
- Q-Tip (born 1970) – rapper
- Paris Qualles (born 1951) – screenwriter and film producer
- Rainey Qualley (born 1989) – actress
- Harvey Quaytman (1937–2002) – abstract painter
- Queen Pen (Lynise Walters, born 1972) – rapper
- Joe Quesada (born 1962) – comic book artist and writer
- Mae Questel (1908–1998) – actress, voice of Betty Boop and Olive Oyl
- Brian Quinn (born 1976) – improvisational comedian, member of The Tenderloins, star of Impractical Jokers
- Josephine Quirk (1882–1976) – screenwriter and film producer

=== R ===
- Lily Rabe (born 1982) – actress
- Renee Rabinowitz (1934–2020) – psychologist and lawyer
- Raekwon (Corey Woods, born 1970) – rapper (Wu-tang Clan)
- Bill Rafferty (1944–2012) – comedian
- Angela "Big Ang" Raiola (1960–2016) – reality television personality (Mob Wives and Big Ang)
- Manny Ramirez (born 1972) – MLB player
- Joey Ramone (1951–2001), Johnny Ramone (1948–2004), Tommy Ramone (1949–2014), CJ Ramone (born 1965) and Marky Ramone (born 1952) – punk-rock musicians former members of The Ramones.
- Alex Ramos (born 1961) – boxer
- Michael Rapaport (born 1970) – actor, comedian, director
- Condola Rashad (born 1986) – actress
- Tubby Raskin (1902–1981) – basketball player and coach
- Ray Ratkowski (born 1939) – football player
- Devin Ratray (born 1977) – actor
- Larry Ray (born 1959) – criminal convicted of sex trafficking, extortion, forced labor, and other offenses, sentenced to 60 years in prison
- Melissa Rauch (born 1980) – actress and comedian
- Lihie Raz (born 2003) – American-born Israeli Olympic artistic gymnast
- Karlie Redd (born 1973) – television personality, model and actress
- Alan Reed (1907–1977) – actor
- Lou Reed (1942–2013) – rock musician, songwriter
- Robert I. Rees (1871–1936) – US Army brigadier general, AT&T executive
- Christopher Reeve (1952–2004) – actor
- Christopher "Kid" Reid (born 1964) – rapper and actor
- Kareem Reid (born 1975) – basketball player
- Brandon Reilly (born 1981) – musician, guitarist, singer
- Charles Nelson Reilly (1931–2007) – actor and comedian
- Carl Reiner (1922–2020) – comedian, actor, director, author
- Rob Reiner (1947–2025) – actor and director
- Estelle Reiner (1914–2008) – actress and singer
- Ray Reinhardt (1930-2026) - actor
- Paul Reiser (born 1956) – actor
- Charlie Reiter (born 1988) – footballer
- Remedy (Ross Filler, born 1972) – rapper
- Leah Remini (born 1970) – actress
- Ed Rendell (born 1944) – former mayor of Philadelphia, governor of Pennsylvania
- Peter Revson (1939–1974) – race car driver
- Bebe Rexha (born 1989) – singer-songwriter
- Vincent Rey (born 1987) – football player
- Judy Reyes (born 1967) – actress
- Ving Rhames (born 1959) – actor
- Alfonso Riberio (born 1971) – actor, comedian, singer, television host
- Charles E. Rice (1931–2015) – legal scholar, university professor
- Buddy Rich (1917–1987) – jazz drummer
- DJ Richie Rich (Richard Lawson, born 1969) – DJ and record producer, member of 3rd Bass
- Renée Richards (born 1934) – tennis player
- Terry Richardson (born 1965) – fashion photographer
- Adam Richman (born 1974) – television host
- Kadary Richmond (born 2001) – college basketball player for the Seton Hall Pirates
- Burton Richter (1931–2018) – Nobel Prize-winning physicist
- Don Rickles (1926–2017) – comedian
- Kathleen Ridder (1922–2017) – women's equal rights activist, writer, educator, philanthropist
- Robert Ridder (1919–2000) – Ice hockey administrator and media mogul
- Joel Rifkin (born 1959) – serial killer
- Robin Riker (born 1952) – actress and book author
- Teddy Riley (born 1967) – singer-songwriter and record producer, member of Guy and Blackstreet
- Thelma Ritter (1902–1969) – actress
- Joan Rivers (born Joan Alexandra Molinsky, 1933–2014) – comedian
- Johnny Rivers (born 1943) – musician
- Melissa Rivers (born 1968) – actress and television personality
- Phil Rizzuto (1917–2007) – MLB player and commentator
- Brian Robbins (born 1963) – filmmaker
- Tim Robbins (born 1958) – actor
- Doris Roberts (1925–2016) – actress
- Leon Robinson (born 1962) – actor
- Sugar Ray Robinson (1921–1989) – boxer
- Chris Rock (born 1965) – comedian and actor
- Monti Rock III (1939–2026) – hairdresser, musician and performer
- Tony Rock (born 1974) – comedian and actor
- Laurance Rockefeller (1910–2004) – conservationist and philanthropist
- Winthrop Rockefeller (1912–1973) – governor of Arkansas
- Norman Rockwell (1894–1978) – artist
- A$AP Rocky (born 1988) – rapper
- Nile Rodgers (born 1952) – musician, songwriter and record producer, member of Chic
- Alex Rodriguez (born 1975) – baseball player
- John Rogan (born 1960) – football player
- Al Roker (born 1954) – weatherman and television personality
- Sonny Rollins (1930–2026) – jazz saxophonist
- Ray Romano (born 1957) – comedian and actor
- John Romita Jr. (born 1956) – comic book artist
- John Romita Sr. (1930–2023) – comic book artist
- Saoirse Ronan (born 1994) – American-born Irish actress
- Igal Roodenko (1917–1991) – civil-rights activist, pacifist
- Sean Rooks (1969–2016) – basketball player and coach
- Kevin Rooney (born 1956) – boxer and boxing trainer
- Mickey Rooney (1920–2014) – actor
- Eleanor Roosevelt (1884–1962) – U.S. First Lady and human-rights activist
- Franklin Roosevelt (1882–1945) – 32nd president of the United States
- Theodore Roosevelt (1858–1919) – 26th president of the United States
- Alan Rosen (born 1969) – restaurant and bakery owner, and author
- Beatrice Rosen (born 1977) – actress (raised in Paris)
- Jeffrey Rosen – billionaire businessman
- Robert Rosen (1934–1998) – theoretical biologist
- Sam Rosen (born 1947) – sportscaster
- Aaron "Rosy" Rosenberg (1912–1979) – two-time "All-American" college football player, and film and television producer
- Ethel Greenglass Rosenberg – convicted spy
- Julius Rosenberg – convicted spy
- David H. Rosenbloom – author
- Christopher Ross (1931–2023) – sculptor, designer and collector
- Nicole Ross (born 1989) – Olympic foil fencer
- Emmy Rossum (born 1986) – actress
- Veronica Roth (born 1988) – novelist
- David René de Rothschild (born 1942) – banker
- Royal Flush (Ramel Govantes, born 1975) – rapper
- Ella Rubin (born 2001) – actress
- Kevin Rudolf (born 1983) – singer
- Mercedes Ruehl (born 1948) – actress
- Vic Ruggiero – ska musician frontman of The Slackers
- Maelo Ruiz (born 1966) – salsa singer
- Louis Rukeyser (1933–2006) – business columnist, economic commentator
- Charles E. Rushmore (1857–1931) – businessman and attorney, namesake of Mount Rushmore
- Frank Russek (1875/1876–1948) – Polish-born American co-founder of the Russeks department store chain
- Damien Russell (born 1970) – NFL player
- Gianni Russo (born 1943) – actor, singer, and restaurateur
- James Russo (born 1953) – actor
- Art Rust Jr. (1927–2010) – sportscaster
- Amy Ryan (born 1968) – actress
- Mark Rydell (1929-2026) - actor, producer, film director

=== S ===
- Benny Safdie (born 1986) – filmmaker and actor
- Josh Safdie (born 1984) – filmmaker
- Carl Sagan (1934–1996) – physicist and astronomer
- Boris Said (born 1962) – NASCAR driver
- Theresa Saldana (1954–2016) – actress
- Zoe Saldaña (born 1978) – actress
- J. D. Salinger (1919–2010) – author
- Jonas Salk (1914–1995) – medical researcher
- John Salley (born 1964) – basketball player
- Jerry Saltz (born 1951) – art critic and art historian
- Jennifer San Marco (1961–2006) – mass murderer
- Claudio Sanchez (born 1978) – musician
- Bernie Sanders (born 1941) – U.S. senator for Vermont and major two-time presidential candidate
- Metta Sandiford-Artest (born 1979) – NBA player
- Adam Sandler (born 1966) – actor, comedian
- Isabel Sanford (1917–2004) – actress
- Merlin Santana (1976–2002) – actor
- Saundra Santiago (born 1957) – actress
- Reni Santoni (1938–2020) – actor
- Romeo Santos (born 1981) – singer-songwriter, actor, and record producer
- Mia Sara (born 1967) – actress
- Dennis Sarfate (born 1981) – professional baseball player
- Dustin Satloff – entrepreneur
- Camille Saviola (1950–2021) – actress
- Gregory Scarpa (1928–1994) – Caporegime and hitman for the Colombo crime family
- Francesco Scavullo (1921–2004) – photographer
- Dick Schaap (1934–2001) – journalist
- Jeremy Schaap (born 1969) – journalist
- Dolph Schayes (1928–2015) – NBA player and coach
- Vincent Schiavelli (1948–2005) – actor and food writer
- Harvey Schiller (born 1940) – sports and business executive
- Lawrence Schiller (born 1936) – photojournalist and film producer
- Steve Schirripa (born 1957) – actor
- Leonard Schleifer (born 1952) – scientist and business executive
- Tatiana Schlossberg (1990–2025) – environmental journalist, author
- Julian Schnabel (born 1951) – artist and motion picture director
- Noah Schnapp (born 2004) – actor
- Mathieu Schneider (born 1969) – hockey player
- Sandra Schnur (1955–1994) – disability-rights activist
- Andy Schor (born 1975) – member of the Michigan House of Representatives
- Bitty Schram (born 1968) – actress
- Loretta Schrijver (born 1956) – Dutch television host
- Rick Schroder (born 1970) – actor
- Debbie Wasserman Schultz (born 1966) – U.S. representative for Florida
- Freddy Schuman (1925–2010) – superfan of the New York Yankees
- Amy Schumer (born 1981) – actress and comedian
- Chuck Schumer (born 1950) – U.S. senator for New York and House minority leader; cousin of Amy Schumer
- Ben Schwartz (born 1981) – actor and comedian
- Julius Schwartz (1915–2004) – comic book editor
- David Schwimmer (born 1966) – actor
- Annabella Sciorra (born 1960) – actress
- Catherine Scorsese (1912–1997) – actress; mother of Martin Scorsese
- Charles Scorsese (1913–1993) – actor; father of Martin Scorsese
- Francesca Scorsese (born 1999) – actress; daughter of Martin Scorsese
- Martin Scorsese (born 1942) – film director
- Mona Scott-Young (born 1967) – television producer (Love & Hip Hop)
- Rosanna Scotto (born 1958) – news anchor
- Lauren Scruggs (born 2003) – Olympic fencer
- Vin Scully (1927–2022) – sportscaster
- Dante Sealy (born 2003) – soccer player who represented the Trinidad and Tobago national team
- Malik Sealy (1970–2000) – NBA player
- John Sebastian (born 1944) – singer and musician, member of The Lovin' Spoonful
- Heriberto Seda (born 1967) – serial killer who copied The Zodiac Killer
- Jon Seda (born 1970) – actor
- Barney Sedran (1891–1964) – Hall of Fame basketball player
- Kyra Sedgwick (born 1965) – actress
- Jerry Seinfeld (born 1954) – comedian and actor
- Julius Seligson (1909–1987) – tennis player
- Edward Selzer (1893–1970) – film producer, Warner Bros.
- Maurice Sendak (1928–2012) – author and illustrator
- MC Serch (Michael Berrin, born 1967) – rapper and record executive, member of 3rd Bass
- Frank Serpico (born 1936) – retired NYPD detective and whistleblower
- Raymond Serra (1936–2003) – actor
- John Serry Sr. (1915–2003) – accordionist, organist, composer, and arranger
- Cynthia Propper Seton (1926–1982) – novelist
- Elizabeth Ann Seton (1774–1821) – founder of Sisters of Charity; first native-born US citizen canonized
- Ruth Seymour (1935–2023) – broadcasting executive
- Tupac Shakur (1971–1996) – rapper and actor
- Gene Shalit (1926–2026) – film critic
- God Shammgod (born 1976) – NBA player and coach
- Frank Shannon (1874–1959) – conservative political analyst, columnist, and candidate
- Judy Shapiro-Ikenberry (born 1942) – long-distance runner
- Al Sharpton (born 1954) – civil rights and social justice activist, founder of the National Action Network, Baptist minister, and radio and television personality
- Artie Shaw (1910–2004) – bandleader
- Wallace Shawn (born 1943) – actor
- Leonard Shecter (1926–1974) – journalist and author
- Ally Sheedy (born 1962) – actress
- Emmet Sheehan (born 1999) – Major League Baseball pitcher
- Charlie Sheen (born 1965) – actor
- Jerry Sheindlin (born 1933) – judge and television personality
- Judy Sheindlin ("Judge Judy") (born 1942) – judge and television personality
- Art Sherman (born 1937) – horse trainer and jockey
- Norm Sherry (1931–2021) – catcher, manager, and coach in Major League Baseball
- Brooke Shields (born 1965) – actress and model
- Kevin Shields (born 1963) – musician, member of the band My Bloody Valentine
- Talia Shire (born 1946) – actress
- Jonathan Shore (born 2007) – soccer player
- Ethel Shutta (1896–1976) – actress and singer
- Shyne (Moses Michael Levi Barrow, born 1978) – Belizean rapper and politician
- Daniel Sickles (1819–1914) – Civil War general
- Gabourey Sidibe (born 1983) – actress
- William James Sidis (1898–1944) – mathematician, rumored to have had an IQ of 250
- Bugsy Siegel (1906–1947) – gangster
- Jules Siegel (1935–2012) – author
- Maggie Siff (born 1974) – actress
- George Silides (1922–2022) – politician and businessman, Alaska senator
- Beverly Sills (1929–2007) – opera singer
- Lauren Silva (born 1987) – painter
- Ron Silver (1946–2009) – actor and radio show host
- Robert Silverberg (born 1935) – author
- Miriam Silverman (born 1977) – actress
- Dean Silvers – film producer
- Alan Silvestri (born 1950) – film music composer
- Carly Simon (born 1943) – singer-songwriter
- Neil Simon (1927–2018) – playwright
- Richard L. Simon (1899–1960) – businessman and publisher
- Danny Simmons (born 1953) – artist
- Diggy Simmons (born 1995) – rapper
- Joseph "Run" Simmons (born 1964) – rapper, member of Run-DMC
- Russell Simmons (born 1957) – record executive, founder of Def Jam Recordings
- Ray Simpson (born 1954) – singer, member of Village People
- Kaseem Sinceno (born 1976) – football player
- Bryan Singer (born 1965) – filmmaker
- Demi Singleton (born 2007) – actress
- Robert Sirico (born 1951) – Catholic priest, founder of Acton Institute
- Tony Sirico (1942–2022) – actor
- John Slidell (1793–1871) – senator from Louisiana and Confederate diplomat
- Lindsay Sloane (born 1977) – actress
- Elissa Slotkin (born 1976) – U.S. senator for Michigan
- Sherrod Small (born 1973) – comedian
- Al Smith (1873–1944) – governor of New York and presidential candidate
- Brooke Smith (born 1967) – actress
- James McCune Smith (1813–1865) – abolitionist
- Kenny Smith (born 1965) – NBA player and commentator
- Russ Smith (born 1991) – basketball player
- Stephen A. Smith (born 1967) – sports analyst and television personality
- Will Smith (1981–2016) – NFL player
- Jake Smollett (born 1989) – actor and cooking personality
- Jurnee Smollett (born 1986) – actress
- Patty Smyth (born 1957) – singer
- Dee Snider (born 1955) – singer-songwriter; front man of the heavy metal band Twisted Sister
- Wesley Snipes (born 1962) – actor
- Phoebe Snow (1950–2011) – singer-songwriter
- Leelee Sobieski (born 1983) – actress
- Jesse Lee Soffer – actor
- Sombr – singer
- Stephen Sondheim (1930–2021) – musical theatre composer and lyricist
- Barry Sonnenfeld (born 1953) – filmmaker
- Aaron Sorkin (born 1961) – playwright and screenwriter
- Mira Sorvino (born 1967) – actress
- Paul Sorvino (1939–2022) – actor
- Talisa Soto (born 1967) – actress and model
- Sonia Sotomayor (born 1954) – United States Supreme Court justice
- Aries Spears (born 1975) – comedian and actor
- Phil Spector (1939–2021) – record producer
- Mickey Spillane (1918–2006) – author
- Joe Spinell (1936–1989) – actor
- Howard Spira – gangster and gambler
- Eliot Spitzer (born 1959) – former governor of New York
- Marina Squerciati (born 1984) – actor
- Kristoff St. John (1966–2019) – actor
- Melissa St. Vil (born 1983) – boxer
- Sylvester Stallone (born 1946) – actor, director, screenwriter
- Sebastian Stan (born 1982) – actor
- Paul Stanley (born 1952) – hard-rock guitarist, singer and songwriter
- Barbara Stanwyck (1907–1990) – actress
- Jean Stapleton (1923–2013) – actress
- Joe Start (1842–1927) – Major League Baseball player
- Peter Steele (1962–2010) – singer and songwriter
- James Steen (1913–1983) – football player
- Charley Steiner (born 1949) – sports commentator and broadcast journalist
- Jacob Steinmetz (born 2003) – baseball player
- John Sterling (1938–2026) – sports broadcaster
- David Stern (1942–2020) – lawyer and business executive, 4th commissioner of the NBA
- Howard Stern (born 1954) – radio and television host
- John Stevens (1715–1792) – delegate to Continental Congress for New Jersey
- Alex Stewart (1964–2016) – boxer
- Andrew Stewart (born 1965) – player of gridiron football
- Jon Stewart (born 1962) – writer, producer, political satirist, actor, television personality, comedian, and former host of The Daily Show (1999–2015); born in New York City, raised in New Jersey
- Julia Stiles (born 1981) – actress
- Ben Stiller (born 1965) – actor and comedian
- Jerry Stiller (1927–2020) – actor and comedian
- Henry L. Stimson (1867–1950) – politician and diplomat
- Oliver Stone (born 1946) – film director
- Larry Storch (1923–2022) – actor, comedian
- Steve Stoute (born 1970) – record executive
- Lee Strasberg (1901–1982) – Polish-born actor, director, and theatre practitioner
- Susan Strasberg (1938–1999) – actress
- Robert Strassburg (1915–2003) – composer, conductor, musicologist
- Marcia Strassman (1948–2014) – actress
- James Strauch (1921–1998) – Olympic fencer
- Barbra Streisand (born 1942) – singer and actress
- Rod Strickland (born 1966) – NBA player
- Matt Striker (born 1974) – professional wrestler and commentator
- Scott Stringer (born 1960) – New York City comptroller and borough president of Manhattan
- Jill Stuart – fashion designer
- Big Sue – shopkeeper and underworld figure
- Ed Sullivan (1901–1974) – television variety show host
- Susan Sullivan (born 1942) – actress
- Tika Sumpter (born 1980) – actress
- Florence Sundstrom (1918–2001) – actress
- B. J. Surhoff (born 1964) – MLB player
- Rich Surhoff (born 1962) – MLB player
- Leonard Susskind (born 1940) – theoretical physicist
- Bruce Sussman (born 1949) – lyricist and librettist
- Kevin Sussman (born 1970) – actor
- Keith Sweat (born 1961) – singer
- Alexa Swinton (born 2009) – actress

=== T ===
- Ronald Tackmann (1953–2020), painter, sculptor
- Nedra Talley (1946–2026), singer
- Shannon Tavarez (1999–2010) – actress
- Vic Tayback (1930–1990) – actor
- Teyana Taylor (born 1990) – singer-songwriter, actress, dancer, choreographer, director and model
- Veronica Taylor (born 1965) – actress, Pokémon
- Tazz (Peter Senercia, born 1967) – radio personality, color commentator and retired professional wrestler
- Lil Tecca (born 2002) – rapper
- Sebastian Telfair (born 1985) – NBA player
- Alma Tell (1898–1937) – stage and screen actress
- Olive Tell (1894–1951) – stage and screen actress
- Chloe Temtchine (born 1982/1983) – singer-songwriter
- Studs Terkel (1912–2008) – author and historian
- Richard Termini (born 1956) – musician
- Milton Terris (1915–2002) – public health physician and epidemiologist
- Roy M. Terry (1915–1988) – chief of chaplains of the U.S. Air Force
- Mark Texeira (born 1961) – comic book artist
- Vinny Testaverde (born 1963) – NFL player
- Irving Thalberg (1899–1936) – film producer
- Eddie Kaye Thomas (born 1980) – actor
- Ianthe Thomas (1951–2002) – author
- Leon Thomas III (born 1993) – actor
- Soren Thompson (born 1981) – two-time Olympic and team World Champion épée fencer
- Dominique Thorne (born 1997) – actress
- Johnny Thunders (1952–1991) – rock musician
- Gene Tierney (1920–1991) – actress
- Harry Tietlebaum – organized crime figure
- Louis Comfort Tiffany (1848–1933) – artist
- Whitney Tilson (born 1966) – hedge fund manager, philanthropist, author, and Democratic political activist
- Dennis Tito (born 1940) – engineer, entrepreneur, and first space tourist
- Matt Titus – professional matchmaker
- Lil Tjay (born 2001) – rapper
- James Toback (born 1944) – screenwriter and director
- Isabella Tobias (born 1991) – Israeli ice dancer
- Lola Todd (1904–1995) – silent film actress
- Bill Todman (1916–1979) – game show producer
- Michael Tolkin (born 1950) – filmmaker and novelist
- Marisa Tomei (born 1964) – actress
- Jacob Toppin (born 2000) – NBA player
- Obi Toppin (born 1998) – NBA player
- Frank Torre (1931–2014) – MLB player
- Joe Torre (born 1940) – MLB player and manager
- Gina Torres (born 1969) – actress
- Ritchie Torres (born 1988) – U.S. representative for New York
- Douglas Townsend (1921–2012) – composer and musicologist
- Michelle Trachtenberg (1985–2025) – actress
- Mary Travers (1936–2009) – singer with Peter, Paul, and Mary
- Payson J. Treat (1879–1972) – Japanologist
- Alex Treves (1929–2020) – Italian-born American Olympic fencer
- Bernard Trink (1931–2020) – columnist
- R-Kal Truluck (1974–2019) – NFL player
- Barron Trump (born 2006) – son of Donald Trump, the 45th and 47th president of the United States
- Donald Trump (born 1946) – 45th and 47th president of the United States, businessman
- Donald Trump Jr. (born 1977) – businessman
- Eric Trump (born 1984) – businessman
- Fred Trump (1905–1999) – real estate developer and philanthropist
- Ivanka Trump (born 1970) – businesswoman
- Kai Trump (born 2007) – social media personality, daughter of Vanessa Trump and Donald Trump Jr.
- Vanessa Trump (formerly Vanessa Haydon, born 1977) – model, ex-wife of Donald Trump Jr.
- Constance Tsang – filmmaker
- Michael Tucci (born 1946) – actor
- Barbara Tuchman (1912–1989) – historian and author
- Richard Tucker (1913–1975) – opera tenor
- Phallon Tullis-Joyce (born 1996) – soccer player for the United States national team
- Lola Tung (born 2002) – actress
- Gene Tunney (1897–1978) – boxer
- John V. Tunney (1934–2018) – U.S. senator
- Joe Turkel (1927–2022) – actor
- Aida Turturro (born 1962) – actress
- John Turturro (born 1957) – actor and director
- Nicholas Turturro (born 1962) – actor
- William Tweed (1823–1878) – politician
- Liv Tyler (born 1977) – actress
- Steven Tyler (born 1948) – singer, Aerosmith
- Cicely Tyson (1924–2021) – actress
- Mike Tyson (born 1966) – boxer
- Neil deGrasse Tyson (born 1958) – astronomer, science communicator

=== U ===
- Leslie Uggams (born 1943) – singer, actress
- Louis Untermeyer (1885–1977) – poet, anthologist, critic, and editor
- Jimmy Urine (born 1969, also known as James Euringer) – singer, musician, songwriter
- Hikaru Utada (born 1983) – singer, musician

=== V ===
- Andrew Vachss (1942–2021) – lawyer and author
- Xavier Valdez (born 2003) – soccer player who represented the Dominican Republic national team
- Jim Valentino (born 1952) – comic book artist and writer
- Nick Valensi (born 1981) – lead guitarist of rock band The Strokes, musician
- Jim Valvano (1946–1993) – college basketball coach and broadcaster
- Margaret Newton Van Cott (1830–1914) – first woman licensed to preach in the Methodist Episcopal Church
- Jeff Van Drew (born 1953) – U.S. representative for New Jersey
- Dick Van Patten (1928–2015) – actor
- Grace Van Patten (born 1996) – actress
- Joyce Van Patten (born 1934) – actress
- Tim Van Patten (born 1959) – actor, television director and producer
- Cy Vance (born 1954) – New York County district attorney (2014–2022)
- Cornelius Vanderbilt (1794–1877) – businessman
- Gloria Vanderbilt (1924–2019) – actress, fashion model, heiress and socialite
- CoCo Vandeweghe (born 1991) – tennis player
- Luther Vandross (1951–2005) – singer
- John Vargas (born 1958) – actor
- Kia Vaughn (born 1987) – WNBA player
- Robert Vaughn (1932–2016) – actor
- Suzanne Vega (born 1959) – singer-songwriter
- Zelina Vega (born 1990) – professional wrestler
- Andrew Velazquez (born 1994) – MLB player
- Lauren Vélez (born 1964) – actress
- Lorraine Vélez (born 1964) – actress and singer
- John Ventimiglia (born 1963) – actor
- Ben Vereen (born 1946) – actor, dancer and singer
- George Vergara (1901–1982) – NFL player
- V.I.C. (Victor Owusu, born 1987) – rapper
- Justyn Vicky (1990–2023) – bodybuilder
- Idara Victor – actress
- Tommy Victor (born 1966) – musician
- Lisa Vidal (born 1965) – actress
- Kristen Vigard (born 1963) – actress
- Abe Vigoda (1921–2016) – actor
- Charlie Villanueva (born 1984) – NBA player
- Anthony Volpe (born 2001) – MLB player
- Jennifer von Mayrhauser (born 1948) – costume designer
- Sal Vulcano (born 1976) – improvisational and stand-up comedian, member of The Tenderloins, star of Impractical Jokers

=== W ===
- Michael Wachter (born 1943) – professor at the University of Pennsylvania Law School
- Stanley M. Wagner (1932–2013) – rabbi and academic
- Josh Waitzkin (born 1976) – chess player, martial arts competitor, and author
- Christopher Walken (born 1943) – actor
- Adam Walker (born 1963) – football player
- Hezekiah Walker (born 1962) – bishop and gospel artist
- Jimmie Walker (born 1947) – actor and comedian
- Jimmy Walker (1881–1946) – mayor of New York City
- Kemba Walker (born 1990) – NBA player
- Eli Wallach (1915–2014) – actor
- Donald A. Wallance – industrial designer
- Fats Waller (1904–1943) – jazz pianist
- Donnie Walsh (born 1941) – NBA coach and executive
- Jessica Walter (1941–2021) – actress
- Rudolf Wanderone (1913–1996) – professional pool player
- Charles B. Wang (1944–2018) – businessman and philanthropist
- Vera Wang (born 1949) – fashion designer
- Hayes Warner (born 1999) – actress and singer
- Julie Warner (born 1965) – actress
- Bree Warren – model
- Lesley Ann Warren (born 1946) – actress
- Raees Warsi (born 1963) – poet, journalist, and social worker
- Kerry Washington (born 1977) – actress
- Chaunté Wayans (born 1982) – actress and comedian
- Damien Dante Wayans (born 1980) – actor
- Damon Wayans (born 1960) – actor and producer
- Dwayne Wayans (born 1956) – director, producer, and writer
- Keenen Ivory Wayans (born 1958) – actor, director, producer, and writer
- Kim Wayans (born 1961) – actress
- Marlon Wayans (born 1972) – actor and producer
- Nadia Wayans (born 1961) – actress
- Shawn Wayans (born 1971) – actor and producer
- Dave Waymer (1958–1993) – NFL player
- Timothy Weah (born 2000) – soccer player
- Michael Weatherly (born 1968) – actor
- Sigourney Weaver (born 1949) – actress
- Steven Weber (born 1961) – actor
- Brian Wecht (born 1975) – musician, producer for Ninja Sex Party and Starbomb, and member of Game Grumps
- Steven Weinberg (1933–2021) – Nobel Prize-winning physicist
- Bob Weinstein (born 1954) – film producer
- Harvey Weinstein (born 1952) – film producer and convicted sex offender
- Jerry Weintraub (1937–2015) – film producer and talent manager
- Gabriel P. Weisberg (born 1942) – art historian
- Malina Weissman (born 2003) – actress
- Tuesday Weld (born 1943) – actress
- T. Tileston Wells (1865–1946) – attorney and Romanian consul general
- Sheck Wes (born 1998) – rapper
- Leslie West (1945–2020) – rock musician
- Mae West (1893–1980) – actress
- Nathanael West (1903–1940) – author
- Yael Averbuch West (born 1986) – soccer player and sports executive
- Merritt Wever (born 1980) – actress
- Edith Wharton (1862–1937) – author
- Joss Whedon (born 1964) – writer, director, producer, and composer
- Maggie Wheeler (born 1961) – actress
- Sahvir Wheeler (born 2001) – basketball player
- Lou Whitaker (born 1957) – MLB player
- Jeremy Allen White (born 1991) – actor
- Michael Jai White (born 1967) – actor and martial artist
- Sheldon Whitehouse (born 1955) – U.S. senator for Rhode Island
- Billy Whitlock – blackface performer
- Gertrude Vanderbilt Whitney (1875–1942) – sculptor and art patron
- Marion Wiesel (1931–2025) – Austrian-American Holocaust survivor, humanitarian, and translator
- Matthew Wilder (born 1953) – singer and musician
- Lenny Wilkens (1937–2025) – basketball player and coach
- Charles Wilkes (1798–1877) – naval officer and explorer
- Billy Dee Williams (born 1937) – actor
- Cara Williams (1925–2021) – actress
- Clarence Williams III (1939–2021) – actor
- Hype Williams (born 1970) – music video and film director
- Michael K. Williams (1966–2021) – actor
- Vanessa E. Williams (born 1963) – actress
- Vanessa L. Williams (born 1963) – singer and actress
- Zelda Williams (born 1989) – actress and filmmaker, daughter of Robin Williams
- George Willig (AKA "The Human Fly" born 1949) – mountain-climber famous for climbing 2 World Trade Center in 1977
- Fred Wilpon (born 1936) – real estate developer, former owner of the New York Mets
- Debra Wilson (born 1962) – actress and comedian
- Walter Winchell (1897–1972) – newspaper and radio gossip commentator
- Harry Winitsky (1898–1939) – political activist; founding member of the Communist Party USA
- Henry Winkler (born 1945) – actor
- Irwin Winkler (born 1931) – film producer and director
- Dean Winters (born 1964) – actor
- Mike Witteck (1964–1990) – football player
- Ira Wolfert (1908–1997) – war correspondent and writer
- Matthew Wolff (born 1990) – graphic designer
- Bokeem Woodbine (born 1973) – actor
- Lorande Loss Woodruff (1879–1947) – biologist
- Deborah Ann Woll (born 1985) – actress
- Jamal Woolard (born 1975) – actor and rapper
- George Worth (György Woittitz, 1915–2006) – Olympic medalist saber fencer
- Dorsey Wright (born 1957) – actor
- James Hood Wright (1836–1894) – businessman
- Michael Wright (born 1956) – actor
- N'Bushe Wright (born 1969) – actress
- Tanisha Wright (born 1983) – former WNBA player and WNBA head coach
- William H. H. Wroe (1831–1897) – member of the Wisconsin State Assembly
- Jason Wu (born 1982) – fashion designer
- Charles Wuorinen (1938–2020) – composer

=== X ===
- X1 (Bruce Sandlin, 1979–2007) – rapper
- Xaviersobased (born 2003) – rapper, producer

=== Y ===
- Izzy Yablok (1907–1983) – football player
- Sherry Yard (born 1964) – chef, restaurateur and television personality
- Adam "MCA" Yauch (1964–2012) – rapper and musician, member of Beastie Boys
- Tony Yayo (born 1978) – rapper
- Elizabeth Yeampierre – attorney and environmental activist
- Angela Yee (born 1976) – radio personality
- Janet Yellen (born 1946) – former U.S treasury secretary and economist
- Walter Yetnikoff (1933–2021) – music executive, former CEO of CBS Records
- Young MC (Marvin Young, born 1967) – rapper
- Burt Young (1940–2023) – actor
- Kara Young – actress
- Tony Young (1937–2002) – actor
- Ramy Youssef (born 1991) – actor and comedian

=== Z ===
- Laurie Schwab Zabin (1926–2020) – public health researcher and professor
- William Zabka (born 1965) – actor
- David Zaslav (born 1960) – media executive, CEO of Warner Bros. Discovery
- Kristi Zea (born 1948) – production and costume designer, art director
- Andrew Zimmern (born 1961) – chef, restauranteur and television personality
- William Zinsser (1922–2015) – writer, journalist, and professor
- Chuck Zito (born 1953) – actor, stuntman and bodyguard
- Charlotte Zucker (1921–2007) – actress
- Mark Zuckerberg (born 1984) – media executive, chief executive officer of Facebook
- Alan Zweibel (born 1950) – screenwriter, comedian and author
- Joel Zwick (born 1942) – film, television and theater director

== Non-native New Yorkers ==
These people were not born or adopted in New York City, and were raised elsewhere, but are well known for living in New York City.

=== A ===
- William Adams (1807–1880) – academic and clergyman; founder and president of the Union Theological Seminary in the City of New York; born in Connecticut
- Samuel Adler (1809–1891) – rabbi; born in Worms, Germany
- Frederick Styles Agate (1803–1844) – painter; born in England
- Thomas Peter Akers (1828–1877) – vice president of the gold board; born in Knox County, Ohio
- Richard S. Aldrich (1884–1941) – U.S. representative from Rhode Island, practiced law in New York City
- Jason Alexander (born 1959) – actor; born in Newark, New Jersey
- Reytory Angola (c. 1626–1689) – woman from Angola brought to New Amsterdam as a slave, later became a free landowner
- Jennifer Aniston (born 1969) – actress; born in Sherman Oaks, California
- Lisa Ann (born 1972) – pornographic actress, born in Pennsylvania
- Betsy Arakawa (1959–2025) – musician, pianist, born in Honolulu, Hawaii
- Jacinda Ardern (born 1980) - former prime minister of New Zealand, born in Hamilton, New Zealand
- Chester A. Arthur (1829–1886) – U.S. president; born in Fairfield, Vermont
- Isaac Asimov (1920–1992) – author; born in Petrovichi, Russian SFSR
- John Jacob Astor (1763–1848) – first multimillionaire of U.S.; born in Germany

=== B ===
- Morena Baccarin (born 1979) - actress, stars as mickey fox on Sheriff Country, born in Rio de Janeiro, Brazil
- Lucille Ball (1911–1989) – comedian, actress, born in Jamestown, New York
- Drew Barrymore (born 1975) – actress and host of The Drew Barrymore Show, born in Culver City, California
- Count Basie (1904–1984) – jazz pianist and band leader, born in Red Bank, New Jersey
- William Basinski (born 1958) – avant-garde composter, born in Austin, Texas
- Laura Joyce Bell (1854–1904) – contralto, wife of Digby Bell, born in London, England
- Irving Berlin (1888–1989) – composer, lyricist, born in Russia
- Leonard Bernstein (1918–1990) – conductor, born in Lawrence, Massachusetts
- Lewis Black (born 1948) – comedian, born in Silver Spring, Maryland
- C. L. Blood (1835–1908) – physician
- Michael Bloomberg (born 1942) – businessman and mayor, born in Boston, Massachusetts
- Ann Blyth (1927–2026) – actress, born in Mount Kisco, New York
- Mary Booze (1878–1955) – first African-American woman to sit on the Republican National Committee, 1924–1948; moved to New York from Mound Bayou, Mississippi
- David Bowie (1947–2016) – English musician, actor, artist, born in London, England
- Marlon Brando Jr. (1924–2004) – actor, born in Omaha, Nebraska
- Brandy (born 1979) – singer, born in McComb, Mississippi
- Hugh Brannum (1910–1987) – actor, played Mr. Green Jeans on Captain Kangaroo, born in Sandwich, Illinois
- Lottie Briscoe (1883–1950) – stage and silent film actress, born in St. Louis, Missouri
- Tom Brokaw (born 1940) – television journalist, born in Webster, South Dakota
- Orestes Brownson (1803–1876) – writer, abolitionist, pro-labor reformer, Catholic apologist, born in Stockbridge, Vermont
- Ruth Buzzi (1936–2025) – actress, comedian, singer, born in Westerly, Rhode Island
- David Byrne (born 1952) – musician, born in Dumbarton, Scotland

=== C ===
- Antón Cabaleiro (born 1977) – visual artist born in Spain
- Sid Caesar (1922–2014) – comedian and actor, born in Yonkers
- Mariah Carey (born 1969) – singer, born in Huntington, New York
- Wendy Carlos (born 1939) – musician, born in Pawtucket, Rhode Island
- Stokely Carmichael (1941–1998) – political activist, born in Port of Spain, Trinidad and Tobago
- Art Carney (1918–2003) – actor, born in Mount Vernon, New York
- Lynda Carter (born 1951) – actress, singer, born in Phoenix, Arizona
- Enrico Caruso (1873–1921) – opera tenor, born in Naples, Italy
- Willa Cather (1876–1974) – author, born in Back Creek Valley, Virginia
- Connie Chung (born 1946) – television journalist, born in Washington, D.C.
- Dick Clark (1929–2012) – television personality and producer, born in Mount Vernon, New York
- Kelly Clarkson (born 1982) – singer and host of The Kelly Clarkson Show, born in Fort Worth, Texas
- Chelsea Clinton (born 1980) – daughter of President Bill Clinton and former secretary of state Hillary Clinton, born in Little Rock, Arkansas
- DeWitt Clinton (1769–1828) – senator and governor of New York, born in Napanoch, New York
- George M. Cohan (1878–1942) – entertainer and songwriter, born in Providence, Rhode Island
- J. Cole (born 1985) – rapper, artist, born in Frankfurt, Germany
- Anthony Comstock (1844–1915) – reformer, born in New Canaan, Connecticut
- Nanette Comstock (1866–1942) – Broadway actress, born in Albany, New York
- Mark Consuelos (born 1971) – actor and host of Live with Kelly and Mark, born in Zaragoza, Spain
- Bill Cosby (born 1937) – actor and comedian, born in Philadelphia
- Billy Crawford (born 1982) – singer, born in Manila, Philippines
- Fanny Crosby (1820–1915) – hymn writer, born in Southeast, New York
- Tom Cruise (born 1962) – actor, born in Syracuse, New York
- Bill Cullen (1920–1990) – radio host, born in Pittsburgh

=== D ===
- Lorenzo Da Ponte (1749–1838) – librettist to Wolfgang Amadeus Mozart and professor of Italian at Columbia University, born in Ceneda, Italy
- Varina Banks Howell Davis (1826–1906) – wife of Confederate president, born in Mississippi
- Sylvia Day (born 1973) – author, born in Los Angeles
- Mike Dean (born 1965) – hip-hop record producer, songwriter, and multi-instrumentalist, born in Houston
- Mac DeMarco (born 1990) – singer-songwriter, born in Duncan, British Columbia, Canada
- Thomas E. Dewey (1902–1971) – governor of New York
- Vin Diesel (born 1967) – actor
- Marlene Dietrich (1901–1992) – actress, born in Berlin, Germany
- Joe DiMaggio (1914–1999) – baseball player, born in California
- David Dinkins (1927–2020) – former mayor of New York City, born in Trenton, New Jersey
- George Washington Dixon (1801–1861) – performer, newspaper editor
- Denny Doherty (1940–2007) – singer, songwriter, born in Halifax, Nova Scotia
- Frederick Douglass (1818–1895) – abolitionist, born in Cordova, Maryland
- Francis P. Duffy (1871–1932) – priest, World War I chaplain to 69th New York Infantry Regiment, born in Canada
- Kevin Durant (born 1988) – basketball player, born in Washington, D.C.
- Shelley Duvall (1949–2024) – actress, born in Fort Worth, Texas
- Bob Dylan (born 1941) – singer-songwriter, born in Duluth, Minnesota

=== E ===
- Wilberforce Eames (1855–1937) – bibliographer and librarian, born in Newark, New Jersey
- Buddy Ebsen (1908–2003) – actor, dancer, played roles on The Beverly Hillbillies and Barnaby Jones, born in Belleville, Illinois
- Edward Egan (1932–2015) – cardinal archbishop of New York, born in Oak Park, Illinois
- Cass Elliot (1941–1974) – singer, actress, member of The Mamas & The Papas, born in Baltimore, Maryland
- Adriano Espaillat (born 1954) – U.S. representative from New York, former New York state senator and New York state assemblyman
- Patrick Ewing (born 1962) – former NBA All-Star center, born in Jamaica

=== F ===
- Lee Falk (1911–1999) – cartoonist, born in St. Louis
- Barbara Feldon (born 1933) – writer and retired actress
- Millard Fillmore (1800–1874) – U.S. president, born in Summerhill, New York
- Bobby Fischer (1943–2008) – chess champion, born in Chicago
- Carrie Fisher (1956–2016) – actress, born in Burbank, California
- Ella Fitzgerald (1917–1996) – jazz singer, born in Newport News, Virginia
- Barthold Fles (1902–1989) – Dutch-born literary agent
- Steve Forbes (born 1947) – publisher, born in Morristown, New Jersey
- Heather Foster (born 1966) – Jamaican-born professional bodybuilder
- Felix Frankfurter (1882–1965) – associate justice of the Supreme Court of the United States, born in Vienna, Austria
- Morgan Freeman (born 1937) – actor, producer, narrator, born in Memphis, Tennessee
- Henry Clay Frick (1849–1919) – businessman, born in Westmoreland County, Pennsylvania

=== G ===
- Dave Gahan (born 1962) – Depeche Mode singer, born in Epping, Essex, United Kingdom
- Alberta Gallatin (1861–1948) – stage and screen actress, born in Cabell County, West Virginia
- Greta Garbo (1905–1990) – actress, born in Stockholm, Sweden
- Teri Garr (1944–2024) – actress, born in Lakewood, Ohio
- Dizzy Gillespie (1917–1993) – jazz trumpet player, born in Cheraw, South Carolina
- Mark Goddard (1936–2023) – actor, born in Lowell, Massachusetts
- Dan Goldman (born 1976) – U.S. representative from New York
- Miguel Gómez (born 1974) – photographer, born in Bogotá, Colombia
- Erin Gray (born 1950), actress, born in Honolulu, Hawaii
- Alyssa Farah Griffin (born 1989) - former press secretary and white house director, now at CNN as a commentator and The View, born in Los Angeles, California
- Roger Grimsby (1928–1995) – news anchor for KMOX-TV, KGO-TV, WABC-TV, WNBC-TV, and KUSI, born in Butte, Montana
- Savannah Guthrie (born 1971) – anchor for Today show on NBC, born in Sandringham, Victoria, Australia

=== H ===
- Bobby Hackett (1915–1976) – jazz musician, born in Providence, Rhode Island
- Gene Hackman (1930–2025) – actor, born in San Bernardino, California
- Thomas S. Hamblin (1800–1853) – actor, manager of the Bowery Theater
- Alexander Hamilton (1755–1804) – U.S. Founding Father, born in the West Indies
- Albert Hammond Jr. (born 1980) – rhythm guitarist of rock band The Strokes, musician, born in Los Angeles
- Mariska Hargitay (born 1964) – actress, born in Santa Monica, California
- Townsend Harris (1804–1878) – first U.S. diplomat in Japan, one of the founders of the City College of New York, born in Sandy Hill, New York
- Harry Harrison (1930–2020) – radio jockey host for WMCA, WABC, and WCBS-FM, born in Chicago, Illinois
- Randy Harrison (born 1977) – actor, born in Nashua, New Hampshire
- Deborah Harry (born 1945) – singer, actress, born in Union City, New Jersey
- Francis L. Hawks (1798–1866) – politician; priest, Episcopal Church; born in New Bern, North Carolina
- Carlton Hayes (1882–1964) – history professor at Columbia University, U.S. ambassador to Spain, born in Afton, New York
- Ashton Hayward (born 1969) – former mayor of Pensacola, born in Pensacola, Florida
- Sherman Hemsley (1939–2012) – actor television series, born in Philadelphia, Pennsylvania
- O. Henry (1862–1910) – writer, born in Greensboro, North Carolina
- Tommy Hilfiger (born 1951) – fashion designer, born in Elmira, New York
- Hal Hirshorn (1965–2025) – painter and photographer, born in Philadelphia
- Herman Hollerith (1860–1929) – inventor, born in Buffalo, New York
- Lester Holt (born 1959) – journalist and news anchor for the weekday edition of NBC Nightly News and Dateline NBC, born in San Francisco
- Ian Hornak (1944–2002) – realist painter, born in Philadelphia
- Harry Houdini (1874–1926) – illusionist and escape artist; born in Budapest, Hungary
- Matt Hoyle – photographer, previously lived in Los Angeles and Australia
- Arianna Huffington (born 1950) - author, businesswoman, founder of The Huffington Post, born in Athens, Greece
- Langston Hughes (1901–1967) – poet, born in Joplin, Missouri

=== I ===
- Kyrie Irving (born 1992) – basketball player, born in Australia, grew up in New Jersey

=== J ===
- Janet Jackson (born 1966) – singer, born in Gary, Indiana
- Kate Jackson (born 1948), actress, director, born in Birmingham, Alabama
- Jane Jacobs (1916–2006) – economist, urban theorist, and activist
- Kamara James (1984–2014) – Olympic fencer, born in Kingston, Jamaica
- Kevin James (born 1965) – actor, born in Mineola, New York
- Peter Jennings (1938–2005) – television journalist, born in Toronto, Ontario, Canada
- Derek Jeter (born 1974) – baseball player, born in New Jersey
- Weijia Jiang (born 1983) – reporter for WCBS-TV, now at CBS News in Washington, born in Xiamen, Fujian, China
- Lisa Brennan-Jobs (born 1978) - writer, born in Portland Oregon
- Paddy Johnson – art critic
- JonTron (born 1990) – YouTuber, co-creator of Game Grumps, born in Rancho Palos Verdes, California

=== K ===
- Gabriel Kahane – musician, born in Venice Beach, California
- Tim Keller (1950–2023) – speaker, pastor, born in Lehigh, Pennsylvania
- Grace Kelly (1929–1982) – actress, born in Philadelphia, Pennsylvania
- John F. Kennedy (1917–1963) – U.S. senator, 35th president of the united states, born in Brookline, Massachusetts
- Robert F. Kennedy (1925–1968) – U.S. attorney general and U.S. senator, born in Brookline, Massachusetts
- Ted Kennedy (1932–2009) – U.S. senator, born in Boston Massachusetts
- Tom Kennedy (1927–2020) – game show host
- Jack Kerouac (1922–1969) – writer associated with the Beat movement
- Kiesza (born 1989) (full name Kiesza Rae Ellestad) – musician, dancer, and multi-instrumentalist, born in Calgary, Alberta, Canada
- Lisa Kudrow (born 1963) – actress, born in Encino, California
- Howard Kyle (1861–1950) – actor and founding member of Actors' Equity, born in Shullsburg, Wisconsin

=== L ===
- Kirke La Shelle (1862–1905) – playwright and theatrical producer, born in Wyoming, Illinois
- Lachi – singer-songwriter, born in Towson, Maryland
- John Layfield (born 1966) – professional wrestler, born in Sweetwater, Texas
- Fran Lebowitz (born 1950) – writer and public speaker, born in Morristown, New Jersey
- Heath Ledger (1979–2008) – Australian actor
- Amy Lee (born 1981) – singer, born in Riverside, California
- John Lennon (1940–1980) – singer-songwriter, activist; has a memorial in New York's Central Park
- Pierre Lorillard IV (1833–1901) – tobacco manufacturer, born in Westchester County, New York
- Ron Lundy (1934–2010) – radio host and announcer for WNIX, WLOK, WUBR, KZQZ, WABC, WCBS-FM, born in Memphis, Tennessee
- Mike Lupica (born 1952) – journalist, novelist, sports writer, born in Oneida, New York

=== M ===
- Ralph Macchio (born 1961) – actor, born on Long Island
- John Madden (1936–2021) – NFL head coach and color commentator on CBS Sports, born in Austin, Minnesota
- Madonna (born 1958) – singer-songwriter, actress, director, born in Bay City, Michigan
- Earl Manigault (1944–1998) – basketball player, born in Charleston, South Carolina
- Yisroel Mantel – Orthodox rabbi, born in Antwerp, Belgium
- Mickey Mantle (1931–1995) – baseball Hall of Famer, born in Spavinaw, Oklahoma
- Dean Martin (1917–1995) – singer and actor, born in Ohio
- Ricky Martin (born 1971) – singer, born in Puerto Rico
- Jackie Mason (1928–2021) – comedian and actor, born in Sheboygan, Wisconsin
- Jan Matulka (1890–1972) – painter, born in Vlachovo Březí, Czech Republic
- Willie Mays (1931–2024) – baseball Hall of Famer, born in Alabama
- Mike McAlary (1957–1998) – Pulitzer Prize–winning journalist, born in Honolulu
- Linda McCartney (1941–1998) – photographer, wife of Beatle Paul McCartney
- Rue McClanahan (1934–2010) – theater, television, and movie actress, born in Oklahoma
- John McCloskey (1810–1885) – first American-born cardinal, born in Brooklyn
- John McEnroe (born 1959) – tennis player and television commentator, born in Germany
- Zubin Mehta (born 1936) – orchestra conductor, born in Bombay, India
- Scott Mescudi (born 1984) – rapper, singer, songwriter, born in Cleveland
- Seth Meyers (born 1973) – comedian, actor, and television personality, born in Evanston, Illinois
- Adi Meyerson (born 1991) – jazz bassist, born in San Francisco, California
- Bette Midler (born 1945) – singer and actress, born in Honolulu
- Nicki Minaj (born 1982) − rapper and actress, born in Port of Spain, Trinidad and Tobago
- Liza Minnelli (born 1946) – actress and singer, born in Hollywood, Los Angeles
- The Misshapes – DJs and party hosts
- Miyawaki (born 1990) – singer-songwriter musician
- Moondog (born Louis Hardin; 1916–1999) – eccentric street musician and poet, born in Kansas
- Garry Moore (1915–1993) – television show host and producer, born in Baltimore
- Rita Moreno (born 1931) – actress, singer, dancer, born in Humacao, Puerto Rico
- Fabrizio Moretti (born 1980) – drummer of rock band The Strokes, musician, born in Brazil
- John Pierpont Morgan (1837–1913) – businessman, born in Hartford, Connecticut
- Michele Moses – philosopher of education, academic administrator
- Robert Moses (1888–1981) – NYC urban planner and developer, born in New Haven, Connecticut
- Andrew M. Murstein (born 1964) – taxi executive, founder of Medallion Financial

=== N ===
- Joe Namath (born 1943) – professional football player, born in Beaver Falls, Pennsylvania
- Thomas Nast (1840–1902) – German-born American caricaturist and editorial cartoonist; "father of the American cartoon"
- Debbie Nathan – feminist journalist, born in Houston, Texas
- Casey Neistat (born 1981) – YouTuber and entrepreneur, known for many of his projects based in New York
- Colette Nelson (born 1974) – IFBB professional bodybuilder
- Richard Nixon (1913–1994) – former vice president and 37th president of the United States

=== O ===
- Soledad O'Brien (born 1966) – television journalist, born in Saint James, New York
- John Joseph O'Connor (1920–2000) – Roman Catholic cardinal archbishop of New York, born in Philadelphia, Pennsylvania
- Rosie O'Donnell (born 1962) – actress and television personality, born on Long Island
- Mary-Kate and Ashley Olsen (born 1986) – actresses and fashion designers, born in Sherman Oaks, California
- Jacqueline Kennedy Onassis (1929–1994) – First Lady of United States, born in Southampton, New York
- Yoko Ono (born 1933) – artist and singer-songwriter, born in Tokyo, Japan
- Haley Joel Osment (born 1988) – actor, born in Los Angeles
- Hassan Ouakrim (1939/1940–2025) – dancer, choreographer and art collector
- Ginny Owens (born 1975) – singer-songwriter, author and blogger, born in Jackson, Mississippi

=== P ===
- Charlie Parker (1920–1955) – musician in jazz, considered one of the greatest musicians of all time
- Sarah Jessica Parker (born 1965) – actress, born in Nelsonville, Ohio
- George A. Parkhurst (1841–1890) – actor, witnessed Lincoln assassination (born in New York State, died in New York City)
- Natalia Paruz – aka the "Saw Lady", subway musician, born in Givatayim, Israel
- James Patterson (born 1947) – author
- Kira Peikoff (born 1985) – novelist and journalist
- Ronald Perelman (born 1943) – investor, owner of Revlon, born in Greensboro, North Carolina
- Itzhak Perlman (born 1945) – violinist, born in Jaffa, Israel
- Pauley Perrette (born 1969) – actress and singer, acted on NCIS, later owned Donna Bells Bake Shop in New York City, born in New Orleans, Louisiana
- John Phillips (1935–2001) – singer, songwriter, born in Parris Island, South Carolina
- Michelle Phillips (born 1944) – singer, songwriter, actress, born in Long Beach, California
- David Hyde Pierce (born 1959) – actor, born in Saratoga Springs, New York
- Sidney Poitier (1927–2022) – actor, film director, born in Miami, Florida
- Parker Posey (born 1968) - actress, born in Baltimore, Maryland
- Mihajlo Pupin (1858–1935) - physicist, born in Idvor, Austrian Empire
- Alban W. Purcell (c. 1843–1913) – stage actor, born in Wadsworth, Ohio

=== R ===
- Daniel Radcliffe (born 1989) – born in Fulham, London, England, United Kingdom
- Johnny Ramone (1948–2004) – born on Long Island
- Ayn Rand (1905–1982) – Russian-born novelist and philosopher
- Tony Randall (1920–2004) – actor, born in Tulsa, Oklahoma
- Susan Wu Rathbone (1921–2019) – Chinese-born community leader
- Dan Rather (born 1931) – television news anchor, born in Wharton, Texas
- Raven-Symoné (born 1985) – actress and singer; born in Atlanta
- John Reilly (1934–2021) – actor, born in Chicago Illinois
- Ryan Reynolds (born 1976) – actor; born in Vancouver, British Columbia, Canada
- Taylor Richardson (born 2001) – actress and filmmaker
- Kelly Ripa (born 1970) – actress and host of Live with Kelly and Mark, born in Stratford, New Jersey
- John D. Rockefeller (1839–1937) – businessman, born in Richford, New York
- Fred Rogers (1928–2003) – children's television presenter, created and hosted Mister Rogers' Neighborhood, born in Pittsburgh, Pennsylvania
- Richard Rodgers (1902–1979) – composer, born on Long Island
- Andrew Rooney (1919–2011) – CBS 60 Minutes commentator, born in Albany, New York
- Franklin D. Roosevelt (1882–1945) – U.S. president, born in Hyde Park, New York
- Dräco Rosa (born 1969) – composer, singer, and actor, born on Long Island
- Damon Runyon (1880–1946) – journalist and playwright, born in Manhattan, Kansas
- Nipsey Russell (1918–2005) – actor, comedian, dancer, born in Atlanta, Georgia
- Babe Ruth (1895–1948) – professional baseball player, born in Baltimore
- Winona Ryder (born 1971) – actress, born in Winona, Minnesota

=== S ===
- Samia (born 1996) – musician
- Telly Savalas (1922–1994) – actor, born on Long Island
- Menachem Mendel Schneersohn (1789–1866) – rabbi, leader of Chabad hasidic movement, born in Nikolaiv, Russian Empire
- Patti Scialfa (born 1953) – singer-songwriter and guitarist
- Amy Sedaris (born 1961) – actress, writer, and comedian
- David Sedaris (born 1956) – comedian and writer
- Chloë Sevigny (born 1974) – actress, director, and fashion icon, born in Darien, Connecticut
- Jean Shafiroff – philanthropist and socialite
- Fulton J. Sheen (1895–1979) – Catholic bishop, writer, television show host, born in El Paso, Illinois
- Elizabeth Shepley Sergeant (1881–1965) – journalist, novelist, born in Winchester, Massachusetts
- Mikie Sherrill (born 1972) – United States Navy pilot and current Governor of New Jersey, born in Alexandria, Virginia
- Abraham Shiplacoff – Jewish-American trade-union organizer and left-wing political activist, born in Chernihiv, Ukraine
- Alana Shipp – American-Israeli IFBB professional bodybuilder
- Shontelle (born 1985) – singer and songwriter
- Ryan Shore (born 1974) – composer, songwriter, and conductor
- Bobby Short (1924–2005) – jazz musician, born in Danville, Illinois
- Joel Siegel (1943–2007) – film critic, born in Los Angeles
- Gene Simmons (born 1949) – musician, born in Haifa, Israel
- Paul Simon (born 1941) – singer-songwriter, born in Newark, New Jersey
- Frank Sinatra (1915–1998) – singer and actor, born in Hoboken, New Jersey
- Upton Sinclair (1878–1968) – writer, born in Baltimore
- Jaclyn Smith (born 1945) – actress, born in Houston, Texas
- Patti Smith (born 1946) – singer and poet, born in Chicago
- Joe Solomon (1930–2023) – cricketer, born in Port Mourant, Berbice, British Guiana
- Kevin Spacey (born 1959) – actor, director, writer, producer, and comedian
- Abigail Spanberger (born 1979) – U.S. representative and current governor of Virginia, born in Red Bank, New Jersey
- Regina Spektor (born 1980) – singer-songwriter, born in Moscow, Russia
- Francis Spellman (1889–1967) – Roman Catholic Cardinal Archbishop of New York, born in Whitman, Massachusetts
- Bruce Springsteen (born 1949) – singer-songwriter, guitarist, and humanitarian
- Dylan Sprouse (born 1992) – actor, entrepreneur, born in Arezzo, Italy
- Elaine Steinbeck (1914–2003) – actress, stage manager, born in Austin, Texas
- John Steinbeck (1902–1968) – novelist, born in Salinas, California
- George Steinbrenner (1930–2010) – New York Yankees owner, born in Bay Village, Ohio
- Gloria Steinem (1934–2026) – journalist and writer, born in Toledo, Ohio
- Wilhelm Steinitz (1836–1900) – world chess champion, born in Prague, Czech Republic
- Martha Stewart (born 1941) – designer and television personality, born in Jersey City, New Jersey
- Sting (born 1951) – musician, born in England
- Emma Stone (born 1988) – actress, born in Scottsdale, Arizona
- Michael Strahan (born 1971) – actor, television personality, and retired football player, born in Houston
- Meryl Streep (born 1949) – actress, born in Summit, New Jersey
- Peter Stuyvesant (1610–1672) – governor of New Netherland, born in Peperga, Netherlands
- Pat Summerall (1930–2013) – NFL player and announcer color commentator for CBS Sports, born in Lake City, Florida
- Taylor Swift (born 1989) – singer-songwriter

=== T ===
- Eva Tanguay (1878–1947) – vaudeville singer and comedian, born in Quebec
- Maurice Tempelsman (born 1929) – Belgian-American businessman, born in Antwerp, Belgium
- Nikola Tesla (1856–1943) – inventor, engineer and futurist, born in Smiljan, Austrian Empire
- Pankit Thakker (born 1981) – actor
- Samuel J. Tilden (1814–1886) – presidential candidate, born in New Lebanon, New York
- Daniel D. Tompkins (1774–1825) – U.S. vice president, born in Westchester County, New York
- Harry Townes (1914–2001) – actor, born in Huntsville, Alabama
- Frederick Trump (1869–1918) – German-born businessman
- Melania Trump (born 1970) – 45th and 47th First Lady of the United States and model, born in Novo Mesto, Yugoslavia

=== U ===
- Johannes Urzidil (1896–1970) – writer, born in Prague, Bohemia

=== V ===
- Martin Van Buren (1782–1862) – U.S. president, born in Kinderhook, New York
- Andrew VanWyngarden (born 1983) – member of MGMT
- Gary Vaynerchuk (born 1975) – serial entrepreneur and best-selling author
- Nydia Velázquez (born 1953) – U.S. congresswoman and former New York City councilor
- Jon Voight (born 1938) – actor, born in Yonkers, New York
- Kurt Vonnegut (1922–2007) – writer, born and raised in Indianapolis

=== W ===
- Rufus Wainwright (born 1973) – musician, born in Rhinebeck, New York
- John Evangelist Walsh (1927–2015) – writer and historian, editor of the Reader's Digest Bible
- Barbara Walters (1929–2022) – television journalist and personality, born in Boston
- Franklin W. Ward (1870–1938) – Adjutant General of New York
- Dean Wareham (born 1963) – singer-songwriter, born in New Zealand
- Andy Warhol (1928–1987) – artist, born in Pittsburgh
- Denzel Washington (born 1954) – actor, born in Mount Vernon, New York
- Debbie Weems (1950–1978) – actress and singer notably on Captain Kangaroo, born in Houston, Texas
- Raquel Welch (1940–2023) – actress and model, born in Chicago, Illinois
- Tahnee Welch (born 1961) – actress and model, born in San Diego, California
- Walt Whitman (1819–1892) – poet and author, born in West Hills, New York
- Olivia Wilde (born 1984) – actress
- Gene Wilder (1933–2016) – actor, comedian, filmmaker, born in Milwaukee, Wisconsin
- Barney Williams (1824–1876) – Irish-born comedian
- Jayson Williams (born 1968) – basketball player, born in Ritter, South Carolina
- Wendy Williams (born 1964) – media personality, host of The Wendy Williams Show, born in Asbury Park, New Jersey
- Kate Winslet (born 1975) – actress, born in Reading Berkshire, England
- Christopher Woodrow (born 1977) – movie producer, born in Syracuse, New York
- Jason Wu (born 1982) – fashion designer

=== X ===
- Malcolm X (El-Hajj Malik El-Shabazz; 1925–1965) – Muslim, civil rights activist

=== Z ===
- Zohran Mamdani (born 1991) – mayor of New York City, born in Kampala, Uganda

== See also ==
- List of LGBTQ people from New York City
- By borough:
  - List of people from the Bronx
  - List of people from Brooklyn
  - List of people from Manhattan
    - List of people from the Upper East Side
  - List of people from Queens
  - List of people from Staten Island
- List of people from New York (state)
