= Quentin Curry =

American painter

- Born: 1972 (age 53–54); Johnstown, Pennsylvania, U.S.
- Education: Bard College; San Francisco Art Institute alumni
- Known for: Painting

Quentin Curry (born 1972, Johnstown, Pennsylvania) is an artist based in New York City. He specialises in semi-abstract landscapes, such as scenic views and industrial wastelands, painted with a mixture of stone dust and oil paint pressed through fabric to produce textured canvasses.

== About ==
Curry spent his childhood living between Pennsylvania and Florida, where he quickly became acclimated to both the rural and urban life. He moved to Vermont at age 17. Since 1996, Curry has been living in New York City.

== Education ==
Curry attended The Putney School. From 1991 to 1992, he attended Bard College and, from 1994 to 1995 went to the San Francisco Art Institute.

== Career ==
Curry uses a unique technique in his art which is unlike many artists. He applies multiple layers of enamel paint mixed with the dust from stones. Most of his works incorporate industrial landscapes and historical figures. He describes his creative process as painting with three-dimensional relief. The result of this process is a brilliant work bringing the observer into Curry's universe. Curry's most recent work in 2009, "Founder" presents a portrait of President Abraham Lincoln from a different perspective.

== Exhibitions ==
His work has been shown at a number of exhibitions which include:

- Modern Amusements
- Outdoor Sculpture Show'
- Line
- Urban Organics
- Stellan Holm Gallery
- New York and Kantor/Feuer in Los Angeles
- 63 Eleven Gallery, Seattle
- DNA Gallery, Provincetown, Massachusetts
- Markham Murray Gallery, New York City
- Nightingale Gallery, Water Mill, New York
