= Velena G. Ellis =

- Born: Eva Velena Glasgow; June 3, 1914; New York City, New York, United States
- Died: December 3, 1971 (aged 57); San Francisco, California, United States
- Occupations: Police officer; Attorney
- Known for: First African-American woman police officer at the NYPD
- Notable work: Founded a Law School for Women

Velena G. Ellis, Esq. (née Glasgow; June 3, 1914 – December 3, 1971) was an American police officer and attorney who was the first African American woman to be admitted to the New York Bar while at the New York Police Department (NYPD). She joined the force as a matron in 1940, having previously been active in community affairs, including her local NAACP branch; she was appointed an officer in 1941. She worked on juvenile and homicide cases, including referring women and girls to social agencies. Ellis was also the first police officer to be admitted to the New York Bar when still active as a patrolwoman at the 28th precinct. Ellis continued representing clients and left the NYPD in 1948 to practice law full time. She was married to William C. Ellis, and later married Preston G. Williams. She died in San Francisco at the age of 57.
