= Matt Hoyle =

American photographer

- Occupation: Photographer
- Website: matthoyle.com

Matt Hoyle is an American photographer based in New York City. He is most known for publishing Comic Genius: Portraits of Funny People, a book which features photos of famous celebrities like Steve Martin, Tina Fey, Mel Brooks and Carol Burnett.

== Work ==
In October 2013, Hoyle Published Comic Genius: Portraits of Funny People. The book includes over 130 pictures of celebrities and comedians. Mel Brooks wrote the introduction of the book. The Huffington Post called it "an epic new compendium of hilarious photographs." Digital Journal wrote than the book shows "us the truly hilarious sides of funny celebs from Steve Martin to Conan O'Brien to Tina Fey to John Cleese" Hoyle also directed and launched two videos alongside Comic Genius, featuring Steve Martin and Neil Patrick Harris. In one video Steve Martin is locked in a banjo duel with Kermit the Frog. In another short video, Neil Patrick Harris stars as a Buster Keaton-esque character longing for his distant love.

His work has been exhibited at the National Portrait Gallery, London.

== Awards ==
Hoyle's work has received a D&AD award, and PDN Photo Annual & Photographer of the Year at the Masters Cup Color Awards. He has been selected as one of the 200 Best Ad Photographers by Lürzer's Archive, and has appeared multiple times in the IPA Best of Show. Hoyle's work has also won a Cannes Gold Lion. Hoyle was named as one of the 50 greatest street photographers right now by Complex Magazine in 2012.

== Personal life ==
He lived in Los Angeles and Australia before he moved to New York City in 2007.
