= List of people from the Upper East Side =

The Upper East Side is a neighborhood in the borough of Manhattan in New York City. It has a long tradition of being home to some of the world's most wealthy, powerful and influential families and individuals.

== A ==
- Roman Abramovich (born 1966) – businessman, investor, and politician
- Ronnie Abrams (born 1968) – US judge
- William Acquavella (born 1937/38) – art dealer
- George B. Agnew (1868–1941) – politician
- Nawwaf bin Abdulaziz Al Saud – Saudi royal
- Herbert Allen Jr. (born 1940) – businessman
- Woody Allen (born 1935) – film director, writer, and actor
- Rand Araskog (1931–2021) – businessman
- Elizabeth Arden (1878–1966) – businesswoman
- Brooke Astor (1902–2007) – philanthropist and widow of Vincent Astor
- Caroline Schermerhorn Astor (1830–1908) – socialite
- John Jacob Astor IV (1864–1912) – businessman, real estate builder, investor, inventor, writer, lieutenant colonel in the Spanish–American War, who was a passenger on the RMS Titanic and chose to remain on the ship when it sank
- Vincent Astor (1891–1959) – businessman, philanthropist, and member of the prominent Astor family

== B ==
- Jules Bache – banker
- Louis Bacon – hedge fund manager
- Tallulah Bankhead – actress
- Joseph Baratta – investor
- Amzi L. Barber – asphalt tycoon
- Demas Barnes – politician and a United States Representative from New York
- Bernard Baruch – financier
- Robert Bass – businessman and philanthropist
- William Bates – physician
- Stephen Vincent Benét – poet
- Olivier Berggruen – art historian and curator
- Leonard Bernstein – composer, conductor
- Edward Julius Berwind – coal mining magnate
- Heber R. Bishop – businessman and jade collector
- Leon Black – hedge fund manager
- Lloyd Blankfein – banker
- Len Blavatnik – businessman, investor, and philanthropist
- Michael Bloomberg – billionaire philanthropist and former mayor of New York City
- René Bouché – artist and fashion illustrator
- John Vernou Bouvier III – socialite, Wall Street stockbroker, and father of Jacqueline Kennedy Onassis and Lee Radziwill
- Eli Broad – entrepreneur
- Irving Brokaw – heir, figure skater, first American to compete in an Olympic winter sport
- Isaac Vail Brokaw – clothing merchant
- Charles Bronfman – businessman and philanthropist
- Edgar Bronfman Jr. – businessman
- Edgar Bronfman Sr. – businessman and philanthropist
- Matthew Bronfman – businessman, entrepreneur and philanthropist
- Arthur William Brown – illustrator
- Catherine Wolfe Bruce – philanthropist
- Yul Brynner – actor
- Patricia Buckley – socialite
- William F. Buckley Jr. – author
- Tory Burch – fashion designer
- I. Townsend Burden – heir
- James A. Burden Jr. – industrialist

== C ==
- John T. Cahill – lawyer
- Hervey C. Calkin – U.S. representative
- Anthony Campagna – real estate developer
- Truman Capote – novelist
- Mariah Carey – singer
- Andrew Carnegie – industrialist
- Phoebe Cates – actress
- Dick Cavett – comedian and former talk show host
- Marc Chagall – artist
- Robert Chambers – the "Preppie Killer" of Jennifer Levin
- Walid Chammah – executive
- James Chanos – investor
- Gustavo Cisneros – businessman
- Huguette Clark – heiress
- James H. Clark – Netscape founder
- William A. Clark – politician and entrepreneur
- Jill Clayburgh – actress
- Montgomery Clift – actor
- Gifford A. Cochran – entrepreneur and sportsman
- George M. Cohan – entertainer, playwright, composer, lyricist, actor, singer, dancer and producer
- Charles Cohen – real estate developer
- Michael Cohen – attorney for Donald Trump
- Roy Cohn – lawyer, mentor to Donald Trump
- George Condo – artist
- Sean Connery – actor
- Mark Consuelos – actor
- Barbara Corcoran – businesswoman, investor, speaker, consultant, syndicated columnist, author, and television personality
- Ann Coulter – author, political commentator, columnist
- Katie Couric – journalist
- Simon Cowell – television judge and producer
- Gardner Cowles Jr. – publisher
- Joan Crawford – actress
- Aimée Crocker (1864–1941) – heiress, princess, author, world traveler
- George Crocker – businessman

== D ==
- Alexandra Daddario – actress
- Matthew Daddario – actor
- Antonio Damasio – neuroscientist
- Rodney Dangerfield – comedian, actor
- William Augustus Darling – politician
- Michel David-Weill – banker
- Norman Davis – diplomat
- Edward Coleman Delafield – colonel and banker
- John DeLorean – engineer, inventor and executive in the U.S. automobile industry
- Oleg Deripaska – oligarch and philanthropist
- Bob Diamond – former group chief executive of Barclays plc
- Joan Didion – author
- C. Douglas Dillon – diplomat and politician
- Jamie Dimon – banker
- James Dinan – hedge fund manager
- Julio Mario Santo Domingo – diplomat
- Plácido Domingo – tenor, conductor and arts administrator
- Marta Domingo – opera soprano, stage director and designer
- Shaun Donovan (born 1966) – former US Secretary of Housing and Urban Development and director of the Office of Management and Budget, running for mayor of New York City
- Glenn Dubin – hedge fund manager
- James Buchanan Duke – businessman
- Henry J. Duveen – art dealer
- Charles Dyson – businessman
- James Dyson – inventor, industrial design engineer and founder of the Dyson company

== E ==
- Cheryl Eisen – interior designer
- Robert H. Ellsworth – art dealer
- Richard Engel – journalist
- Israel Englander – hedge fund manager
- Jeffrey Epstein – financier and registered sex offender
- Walker Evans – photographer, at 112 East 74th Street

== F ==
- Sherman Fairchild – aviation pioneer
- Linda Fairstein (born 1947) – prosecutor and author
- Philip Falcone – businessman
- José Fanjul – sugar baron
- Mia Farrow – actress
- Stephen Feinberg – investor
- Michael Feinstein – singer
- Barbara Feldon – actress
- Edna Ferber – writer
- Marshall Field – entrepreneur
- Karen Finerman – hedge fund manager and television personality
- Jay S. Fishman – insurance executive
- J. Christopher Flowers – investor
- Jonathan Franzen – National Book Award-winning novelist
- Paul J. Fribourg – businessman
- Henry Clay Frick – industrialist, financier, union-buster, and art patron
- Richard S. Fuld, Jr. – banker

== G ==
- Lady Gaga – singer
- Gerald Garson – former NY Supreme Court justice convicted of accepting bribes
- Ina Garten – author
- Bruce Gelb – businessman and diplomat
- Sarah Michelle Gellar – actress
- James W. Gerard – lawyer and diplomat
- Ricky Gervais – comedian, actor
- Gordon Getty – businessman, investor, philanthropist and classical music composer
- Pia Getty – filmmaker
- John Giorno – artist
- Rudy Giuliani – politician, attorney, businessman, public speaker, former mayor of New York City, and attorney to President Donald Trump
- Barbara Goldsmith – author, journalist, and philanthropist
- Danielle Goldstein (born 1985) – American-Israeli show jumper
- Lawrence E. Golub – entrepreneur, philanthropist, and business executive
- Murray H. Goodman – real estate developer
- Noam Gottesman – hedge fund manager
- Jay Gould – railroad developer
- Ulysses S. Grant – 18th president of the United States, commanding general of the Army, soldier, international statesman, and author
- Peter Grauer – chairman, Bloomberg L.P.
- Kenneth C. Griffin – hedge fund manager
- Bob Guccione – photographer
- Meyer Guggenheim – patriarch of the Guggenheim family
- Simon Guggenheim – politician
- Randolph Guggenheimer – lawyer
- Daphne Guinness – heiress, socialite, fashion designer, art collector, model, musician, film producer and actor
- Thomas Guinzburg – publisher
- John Gutfreund – investment banker

== H ==
- Katie Halper – podcaster and left-wing political commentator
- J. Hooker Hamersley – heir, lawyer and poet
- W. Averell Harriman – governor of New York
- Kitty Carlisle Hart – singer, advocate for the arts and historic preservation
- Henry Osborne Havemeyer – industrialist
- Millicent Hearst – wife of media tycoon William Randolph Hearst
- Drue Heinz – patron of the literary arts, actress, philanthropist and socialite
- Ariel Helwani – mixed martial arts writer
- Ernest Hemingway – writer
- Jim Henson – puppeteer, artist, cartoonist, inventor, screenwriter, and filmmaker
- Leon Hess – founder and President of Hess Corporation and one-time owner of the New York Jets
- David M. Heyman (1891–1984) – financier, philanthropist, art collector
- Tommy Hilfiger – fashion designer
- J. Tomilson Hill – investor
- Henry Hilton – jurist and businessman
- Dennis Hoey – actor
- Lena Horne – singer
- Vladimir Horowitz – pianist and composer
- Alan Howard – hedge fund manager

== I ==
- Bob Iger – CEO

== J ==
- Michael Jackson – singer
- Jeremy Jacobs, Sr. – owner of the Boston Bruins
- Morton L. Janklow – literary agent
- Jasper Johns – artist
- Jed Johnson – Interior designer and filmmaker
- Boris Johnson – prime minister of the United Kingdom
- Woody Johnson – businessman, philanthropist, and diplomat
- Star Jones – lawyer, television personality

== K ==
- Otto Hermann Kahn – investment banker, collector, philanthropist, and patron of the arts
- Harry Kargman – CEO of Kargo
- Jill Kargman – author, writer and actress
- Herbert Kasper – fashion designer
- George S. Kaufman – playwright
- Slim Keith – socialite
- Caroline Kennedy – author and diplomat to Japan, and daughter of U.S. President John F. Kennedy
- James Powell Kernochan – businessman and clubman
- Sante Kimes – criminal
- Stephen King – author
- Kevin Kline – actor
- David H. Koch – businessman, philanthropist, conservative political activist
- Frederick R. Koch – collector and philanthropist
- Doron Kochavi – businessman, lawyer, philanthropist
- Pannonica de Koenigswarter – jazz patron and writer
- Saritha Komatireddy (born 1984 or 1985), federal prosecutor and former chief of staff of the U.S. Drug Enforcement Administration, Republican nominee for attorney general of New York in the 2026 election.
- Jeff Koons – artist
- Jerzy Kosiński – novelist
- Bruce Kovner – hedge fund manager
- Dennis Kozlowski – former CEO of Tyco International
- Nicola Kraus – novelist
- Peter S. Kraus – businessman, philanthropist and art collector
- Henry Kravis – investor
- Jared Kushner – investor, real-estate developer, newspaper publisher, senior advisor to President Donald Trump

== L ==
- Thomas W. Lamont – banker
- Marc Lasry – hedge fund manager
- Aerin Lauder – businesswoman
- Jane Lauder – businesswoman
- Leonard Lauder – businessman, art collector and humanitarian
- William Lauder – businessman, and executive chairman of the Estée Lauder Companie
- Matt Lauer – news anchor
- Charles Lazarus – founder of Toys R Us
- Lewis Cass Ledyard – lawyer
- Harper Lee – author
- Spike Lee – film director and producer
- William B. Leeds – businessman
- Loida Nicolas Lewis – businesswoman who is the widow of TLC Beatrice founder and CEO Reginald Lewis
- Louise Linton – actress
- Robert I. Lipp – businessman
- John Langeloth Loeb Jr. – businessman, philanthropist, former United States ambassador to Denmark, and former delegate to the United Nations

== M ==
- John J. Mack – banker
- Julie Macklowe – beauty entrepreneur and businesswoman
- Princess Madeleine, Duchess of Hälsingland and Gästrikland – Duchess of Hälsingland and Gästrikland
- Andrew Madoff – stockbroker and investment advisor
- Bernard Madoff – ex-hedge fund manager convicted of running a Ponzi scheme
- Madonna – entertainer; purchased $40 million mansion on East 81st Street at Lexington Avenue in 2009
- Carolyn Maloney – politician, former member of United States House of Representatives and the New York City Council
- Stewart and Cyril Marcus – gynecologists
- Barbara Margolis – prisoners' rights advocate, official greeter of New York City
- Anne Windfohr Marion – rancher, horse breeder, business executive, philanthropist, and art collector
- Howard Marks – investor
- Paul Marks – medical doctor, researcher and administrator
- Malachi Martin – author
- Wednesday Martin – author
- Soong Mei-ling – former First Lady of the Republic of China, known as Madame Chiang Kai-shek or Madame Chiang
- Rachel Lambert Mellon – horticulturalist, gardener, philanthropist, and art collector
- J. Ezra Merkin – hedge fund manager
- Charles E. Merrill – philanthropist, stockbroker, and co-founder of Merrill Lynch
- Howard Michaels – founder of the real estate investment advisory firm the Carlton Group
- Bette Midler – singer
- George W. Miller – politician
- Robert Mnuchin – banker
- Steven Mnuchin – investment banker, film producer, hedge fund manager, and secretary of the US Treasury
- Mary Tyler Moore – actress, producer, and social advocate, at 927 Fifth Avenue at East 74th Street
- Sonja Morgan
- Levi P. Morton – 22nd vice president of the United States, ambassador, and former governor of New York
- Robert Moses – city planner, public official, referred to as the "master builder" of New York
- Mark Mulvoy – Sports Illustrated journalist and managing editor
- Charles Murphy – hedge fund manager
- James Murdoch – businessman
- Rupert Murdoch – media mogul
- Wendi Deng Murdoch – businesswoman, and movie producer
- Arthur Murray – dancer

== N ==
- Spyros Niarchos – shipping magnate
- Victor Niederhoffer – hedge fund manager, U.S. Squash Champion, 5x in singles, 2x in doubles; U.S. Paddleball Champion, 2x in singles, 2x in doubles, Pierre de Coubertin Fair Play Trophy
- Cynthia Nixon – LGBTQ actress and politician/activist
- Peggy Noonan – speechwriter for Ronald Reagan, political commentator and author
- Deborah Norville – television anchor and businesswoman
- Chris Noth – actor

== O ==
- Jacqueline Kennedy Onassis – former First Lady of the United States
- Stanley O'Neal – banker
- Frederick Osborn – philanthropist, military leader, and eugenicist
- Katharina Otto-Bernstein – filmmaker

== P ==
- Ashraf Pahlavi – twin sister of the deposed shah
- William S. Paley – executive
- Vikram Pandit – banker
- Sister Parish – interior decorator and socialite
- Dorothy Parker – poet, short story writer, critic, and satirist
- Antenor Patiño – tycoon
- John Paulson – hedge fund manager
- Joan Whitney Payson – heiress, businesswoman, philanthropist, patron of the arts and art collector, and a member of the prominent Whitney family
- Nelson Peltz – investor
- Ronald Perelman – investor
- Antonio Permuy – writer, curator, and art patron
- Holly Peterson – producer, journalist and novelist
- Peter George Peterson – investment banker and United States Secretary of Commerce
- Milton Petrie – retail investor
- George Plimpton – author, humorist, NFL quarterback
- Generoso Pope – Italian-American businessman and newspaper publisher, lived at 1040 Fifth Avenue
- Zac Posen – fashion designer
- Peter O. Price – media proprietor
- Harold Prince – theatrical producer and director
- Joseph Pulitzer – newspaper publisher

== R ==
- Lee Radziwill – princess, sister of Jacqueline Kennedy Onassis
- Stewart Rahr – pharmaceuticals mogul
- Michael Rapaport – actor, internet personality, podcaster
- Lynn Pressman Raymond – toy and game innovator, president of the Pressman Toy Corporation
- Robert Redford – actor
- Michele Singer Reiner – film producer and photographer
- Ira Rennert – investor and businessman
- Kelly Ripa – talk show host
- Joan Rivers – comedian
- David Rockefeller – banker
- John D. Rockefeller Jr. – financier and philanthropist
- Laurance Rockefeller – philanthropist, businessman, financier, and major conservationist
- Carlos Rodríguez-Pastor – businessman
- Felix Rohatyn – investment banker
- Julia Restoin Roitfeld – art director and model
- Eleanor Roosevelt – political figure, diplomat and activist
- Theodore Roosevelt – U.S. president, represented Upper East Side in New York State Assembly at beginning of his political career.
- Elihu Root – former secretary of state
- James Rorimer – museum director
- Aby Rosen – real estate developer
- Christopher Ross – sculptor, designer and collector
- Steve Ross – CEO of Time Warner
- Alexander Rovt – real estate investor
- Marc Rowan – investor
- Helena Rubinstein – businesswoman, art collector, and philanthropist
- Serge Rubinstein – stock and currency manipulator and murder victim
- Jacob Ruppert – brewer

== S ==
- Lily Safra – philanthropist and socialite
- Walter J. Salmon Sr. – real estate developer
- Nassef Sawiris – CEO
- Jacob Schiff – banker
- Jack Schlossberg – writer
- Rose Schlossberg – filmmaker
- Tatiana Schlossberg – journalist and author
- Stephen Schwarzman – businessman
- Martin Scorsese – film director and producer
- Arthur Hawley Scribner – president of Charles Scribner's Sons
- Charles R. Schwab – investor, financial executive, and philanthropist
- Ryan Seacrest – radio personality, television host, and producer
- Terry Semel – Yahoo! CEO
- Bishop Sheen – religious leader
- Leonard Sillman – broadway producer
- David Simon – CEO of Simon Malls
- Ramona Singer – TV personality
- Harry Slatkin – businessman, entrepreneur, and philanthropist
- William Douglas Sloane – businessman, sportsman, philanthropist
- Al Smith – former governor of New York
- George Soros – hedge fund manager
- Andy Spade – fashion designer
- Kate Spade – fashion designer
- Jerry Speyer – real estate developer
- Carl Spielvogel – ambassador to the Slovak Republic
- Eliot Spitzer – former governor of New York
- Kenneth I. Starr – money manager
- John Steinbeck – author
- Saul Steinberg – businessman
- Benjamin Steinbruch – CEO
- Gloria Steinem – journalist
- Michael Steinhardt – financier
- George Stephanopoulos – journalist, political commentator and former Democratic advisor
- Isaac Newton Phelps Stokes – architect
- Willard Dickerman Straight – investment banker, publisher, reporter, Army Reserve officer, diplomat and by marriage, a member of the Whitney family
- Jesse I. Straus – ambassador to France
- Roger Williams Straus Jr. – entrepreneur
- Igor Stravinsky – composer
- Margaret Rockefeller Strong – activist
- Robert L. Stuart – industrialist
- Arthur Ochs Sulzberger – publisher and businessman
- Arthur Ochs Sulzberger, Jr. – publisher
- Sy Syms – founder and owner of Syms Corporation discount clothing retailer; benefactor of Yeshiva University's Syms School of Business

== T ==
- Elie Tahari – fashion designer
- A. Alfred Taubman – businessman, investor, and philanthropist
- Margaretta Taylor – media heiress
- Chloe Temtchine – singer-songwriter
- John Thain – banker
- Jonathan Tisch – chairman and CEO of Loews Hotels & Co.
- Ronn Torossian – public relations executive
- Donald Trump Jr. – businessman and former reality television personality
- Ivana Trump – former model and businesswoman, who was the first wife of Donald Trump
- Ivanka Trump – businesswoman, fashion designer, author, reality television personality, daughter of Donald Trump
- Vanessa Trump – socialite, actress and former model

== U ==
- James Ramsey Ullman – writer and mountaineer
- Roberto Mangabeira Unger – philosopher and politician
- Louis Untermeyer – author, anthologist, editor, poet

== V ==
- Alice Claypoole Vanderbilt – wife of Cornelius Vanderbilt II
- Anne Harriman Vanderbilt – heiress
- Gloria Vanderbilt – artist, author, actress, fashion designer, heiress, and socialite
- William Kissam Vanderbilt II – motor racing enthusiast and yachtsman
- Margit Varga – artist, painter, gallerist, art director, journalist
- Gary Vaynerchuk – entrepreneur, author, speaker and Internet personality
- Leila and Massimo Vignelli – designers
- Vincent Viola – businessman
- Anthony Volpe – baseball player

== W ==
- Mike Wallace (1918–2012) – journalist
- Vera Wang (born 1949) – fashion designer
- Edward Warburg
- Felix M. Warburg
- James Warburg – banker
- Paul Warburg – banker
- Andy Warhol (1928–1987) – artist and filmmaker
- Bruce Wasserstein (1947–2009) – investment banker
- Franz Waxman – composer
- Sigourney Weaver (born 1949) – actress
- Susan Weber (born 1954) – historian
- Boaz Weinstein (born 1973) – hedge fund manager
- Les Wexner (born 1937) – businessman
- Lawrence Grant White – architect
- Mary Jo White (born 1947) – chair of the U.S. Securities and Exchange Commission
- Gertrude Vanderbilt Whitney – sculptor, art patron, collector, and founder of the Whitney Museum of American Art
- William Collins Whitney (1875–1942) – political leader and financier
- Elie Wiesel (1928–2016) – Holocaust survivor and winner of the Nobel Peace Prize in 1986
- Elisha Wiesel (born 1972) – chief information officer of Goldman Sachs; hedge fund manager of the Niche Plus; son of Elie Wiesel
- Alec N. Wildenstein – businessman, art dealer, racehorse owner, and breeder
- Jocelyn Wildenstein – socialite
- Robert B. Willumstad (born 1945) – CEO of AIG
- Steve Witkoff (born 1957) – Special Envoy to the Middle East for U.S. President Donald Trump; real estate investor and developer, founder of the Witkoff Group, attorney
- P. G. Wodehouse (1881–1975) – author
- Tom Wolfe – novelist, founder of New Journalism
- Jayne Wrightsman – philanthropist

== Y ==
- Charles Yerkes – financier

== Z ==
- Pia Zadora – actress
- Paula Zahn – journalist
- Jeff Zucker – media executive
- Mortimer Zuckerman – media mogul

== See also ==
- List of people from New York City
