= New York Foundation =

1909 charitable foundation, NY, NY, US

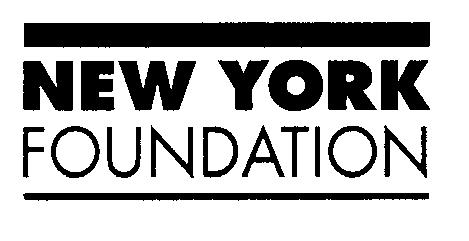
- Founded: 1909
- Founder: Alfred Heinsheimer, Edward Henderson, Jacob H. Schiff, Isaac Newton Seligman, and Paul Warburg
- Purpose: Start-up Organizations, Community Organizing, Advocacy
- Location: New York, New York, United States
- Method: Grants, Funding
- President: Rickke Mananzala
- Endowment: $60 million
- Website: NYF.org

The New York Foundation is a charitable foundation which gives grants to non-profit organizations supporting community organizing and advocacy in New York City.

== History ==
=== 1909–1919 ===
The New York Foundation was established in 1909 when Louis A. Heinsheimer, a partner in banking firm Kuhn, Loeb & Co., died. In his will Heinsheimer bequeathed $1 million to "the Jewish charities of New York" under the condition that they choose to federate within a year of his death.

One year later when the conditions stipulated in Heinsheimer's will had not been met (the Federation of Jewish Philanthropies would not be founded until 1917) the $1 million bequest reverted into the hands of his brother, Alfred M. Heinsheimer, who, in turn, donated the money to the New York Foundation.

The New York Foundation was created by Edward C. Henderson, Jacob H. Schiff, Isaac Newton Seligman, and Paul Warburg in order that they might "distribute... resources for altruistic purposes, charitable, benevolent, educational, or otherwise, within the United States of America".

The Foundation was officially incorporated in April 1909, when the charter drafted by Henderson, Schiff, Seligman, and Warburg was enacted by the New York State Legislature and signed by the Governor, making it one of the oldest organizations of its kind.

In an article published on November 5, 1910, The New York Times wrote an article about Alfred Heinsheimer's decision in which the Foundation's significance as a "non-sectarian" organization was emphasized.

That same year the Foundation gave a $4,100 grant to the Henry Street Settlement so that they might provide low-income families who were unable to afford "hospitals beds" with visiting nurse service. This groundbreaking program led directly to the foundation of the Visiting Nurse Service of New York.

One year later, in 1911 the Foundation gave a grant to the Public Education Association so that they might establish a similar "visiting teacher" service.

In 1912 The New York Prohibition Association received funds from the Foundation for a "protective league" for "girls... working in factories, offices, and shops".

Two grants were awarded to the National Association for the Advancement of Colored People, "a newly formed organization" whose Director of Publicity and Research, W. E. B. Du Bois had personally requested funding from the Foundation for "an investigation of the Negro Public Schools in the United States" as well as for the "Bureau of Legal Redress for Colored People".

The then-recently formed National Urban League also received a grant from the Foundation in that year.

In 1919 the Home for Hebrew Infants tested and proved the superiority of an alternative to institutionalized care by placing orphans with foster parents in private homes. This program was made possible in part by funds from the Foundation.

=== 1920–1949 ===
In 1925 Lionel J. Salomon bequeathed $2.4 million to the Foundation in his will. He specified that the money go toward funding groups aiding children and elderly.

In 1929, ten years after his brother's death, Alfred M. Heimshiemer died, leaving the Foundation $6 million.

In 1930 the Foundation financed studies which "served to focus attention on serious yet previously ignored problems". The Committee on the Costs of Medical Care (CMCC) surveyed the need for medical care in the United States while the Committee for Mental Hygiene analyzed state mental hospitals, then notorious for their "secrecy and ignorance".

In 1934 the Foundation funded a program which helped scholars forced out of Germany by Nazi persecution get jobs at leading American universities.

In 1935 $3,000 given by the New York Foundation to the New York City Bureau of Laboratories led to the development of a vaccine preventing infantile paralysis.

In 1939 the Medical Society of New York received funds from the Foundation in order that they might "experiment in voluntary prepaid medical care". The Foundation's president, David M. Heyman, chaired the mayoral committee which established the Health Insurance Plan of Greater New York, a model for prepaid health care systems to come.

Seeking to give grants to groups that might "correct the condition[s] which cause... social maladjustment", in the 1930s the Foundation was determined to "seek out neglected areas and tension points" where their resources would be most effective.

In 1930 the Foundation paid the salaries of "key staff members" of the Governor's Commission to Investigate Prison Administration and Construction, which created programs for the education and rehabilitation of state prison occupants. Grants were made to both the city and state Department of Corrections, as well as the Social Service Bureau for Magistrate's Court, which provided counseling for criminals with "unfortunate social backgrounds".

In 1943 the New York Foundation cooperated with the Board of Education to produce what The New York Times called an "enriched school program" designed "to see whether juvenile delinquency and maladjustment can be reduced by a closer integration of school and community agencies". 18 teachers in 3 Harlem schools worked alongside "psychologists, psychiatrists, social workers and recreation counselors" to help over 5,000 elementary and junior high school students "receive special guidance" in the hopes of "correcting existing evils that have baffled school leaders for many years" as well as "promis[ing] future dividends in the way of better citizens".

In the aftermath of a series of race riots that occurred in Harlem in 1944, the Foundation helped fund the Mayor's Committee on Unity.

The Foundation celebrated its fortieth anniversary in 1949. The New York Times commended the Foundation on its ability to take "risks... in fields that no other philanthropic organization cared to enter". Calling the $8,000,000 given by the Foundation in its first four decades "an investment", the Times cited the "successful" Health Insurance Plan of Greater New York (H.I.P.) as an example of the Foundation's ability to produce "return[s] in social gain" and wrote "Probably no philanthropic organization ever received more for its money than the New York Foundation".

In another article published contemporaneously the Foundation is praised for "serving a function that governments themselves could not yet adequately perform" in particular because the Foundation "has shown great interest in the problems of minority groups". The New York Times reported that at the time of the Foundation's fortieth anniversary their endowment was worth $11,000,000.

=== 1950–1975 ===
In 1951 the Foundation funded research that led to the development of isoniazid, the first anti-tuberculosis drug.

In 1954 the Foundation's trustees began approving grants to groups focusing on the arts and recreation with support going to Lincoln Center's building fund—the original objective of which was to make the performing arts more affordable to a larger segment of the population.

The Foundation also began giving more grants to groups serving needy children, African-Americans, and the growing Puerto Rican population. ASPIRA, an organization committed to educating and training young Puerto Ricans so that they might achieve leadership roles in their community, was initially funded in part by grants from the New York Foundation.

In 1958, David M. Heyman was asked by Mayor Robert F. Wagner Jr. to head a commission studying the deterioration of municipal hospitals in the city. This study, along with funding from the Foundation itself, led to the founding of the Task Force on the Organization of Medical Services.

Between 1958 and 1962 the New York Foundation gave more than $4,700,000 in grants. 40.4% of those grants were given as "'seed money' to stimulate research and expansion and modernization of existing medical school and hospital and nursing service programs. The Foundation's President at the time, David M. Heyman, was quoted in The New York Times, saying "We are far from the day when private philanthropy can write off medicine as a piece of finished business... there is all too often a dismal gap between purse research and the practical application of it".

In the 1960s the Foundation had begun making grants outside of its "traditional" restriction of the five boroughs. These included grants made to "selected civil rights efforts" in the Southern United States in the belief that "the struggle for civil rights in the South would have an enormous impact on the lives of the city's black citizens".

In 1963 the New York Foundation made a grant to Synanon, an "experimental, drug-free rehabilitation program" in California. This was followed by grants given to similar "therapeutic communities" in and around New York City.

On the Foundation's fiftieth anniversary David M. Heyman was quoted in The New York Times saying "We have always felt that the Foundation should be a leader in sensing the trends of society, in helping develop the means of adjusting society to its new problems... The Foundation must probe, experiment and gamble on new social forms... We try to be objective... We try to keep mobile and not committed for too long a time..."

Between 1956 and 1957, the Foundation gave over $2,000,000 in grants to 140 institutions. The New York Times reported that these grants were "the largest for any comparable period since the Foundation was organized in 1909". More than $1,000,000 went to "agencies concerned with public health and medicine", more than $500,000 went to "social welfare groups", and almost $400,000 went to groups supporting "the advancement of education and the arts". President David M. Heyman said that the Foundation's goal was "to identify new areas of need and... put financial resources to work on those particularly pressing problems whose solutions would promise the greatest good". He noted that the Foundation's strength lay in its ability to "withdraw from a field as rapidly as it entered" and that the Foundation was "relying on a ready public response to carry a good work forward on its own".

Among the grants awarded to medical institutions, The New York Times reported that over $500,000 in grants had been made toward mental health programs, over $100,000 toward medical research groups studying "eye surgery, the deaf, protein structure, and the effects of radiation on genetics", and over $140,000 toward medical and nursing education, including one group supporting the "re-education of foreign physicians [unable] to meet state examinations". A $50,000 grant to the Hospital Research and Education Trust received special attention in the press. The New York Times wrote that the program "promises the first important break-through in decades in reducing mounting costs of hospital care... for the chronically-disabled".

By 1968 the Foundation was again focused on addressing the economic, housing, and educational needs of local communities in New York City. Grants made funded everything from a study of lead poisoning among children in the South Bronx to a program of financial assistance for students from disadvantaged urban areas and from fuel cooperatives for tenant-managed buildings to the advanced training of minority personnel in various professions.

At the same time, funding was given to support national programs whose work "affected problems of concern at the local level", such as the National Council on Hunger and Malnutrition and the National Committee Against Discrimination in Housing.

In 1969 the impending decentralization of the public school system led the Foundation to give grants to the Public Education Association as well as the New York Lawyers' Committee for Civil Rights Under Law, which educated lawyers on the relevant legislation.

In addition grants were made to several experimental programs in the public school system, including three "innovative" community schools: East Harlem Block School, the Children's Community Workshop School, and the Lower East Side Action Project.

In the 1970s the Foundation began making grants to "organizations concerned with affordable housing the revitalization of low-income neighborhoods". These included the West Harlem Community Organization, East Harlem Interfaith, the Upper Park Avenue Community Association, United Neighborhood Houses, and other programs committed to management training, tenant organizing, and housing rehabilitation services.

In 1973 a $10,000 grant from the New York Foundation went to the founding of the Hunter College Institute for Trial Judges, which The New York Times described as "a forum for the discussion of the courts and social change [that is] the first of its kind in the country". 30 New York judges, along with several prominent social scientists conducted a series of seminars and discussion groups. The institute's founder, Dr. Blanche D. Blank, was quoted in the Times, saying "We would like to make available to trial judges the insights and finding of current scholarship and, at the same time, bring to the academic world some of the special knowledge and experience of the bench".

=== 1975–2010 ===
In 1975 New York City's fiscal crisis began. In that year the Foundation Board's Planning Committee reviewed and revised the policies of the foundation, reemphasizing the foundation's role as an "innovator, as the provider of seed money to new programs that would eventually be picked up by more traditional funding sources" while choosing to "no longer consider grants in the arts or medicine". In the wake of the "devastating impact that the financial crisis [had] on the City's already ravaged neighborhoods" the Foundation "redoubled its efforts" and commitment to "the young and the aged, the poor and minorities" as well as "people and groups working to improve their own communities". Grants were given to several neighborhood preservation groups including the Pratt Institute Center for Community and Environmental Development and the Association of Neighborhood Housing Developers.

In 1976 The New York Times listed the Foundation as one of the largest funders of the city's Bicentennial Old New York Festival.

In 1978 the New York Foundation once again began making start-up grant to "new untested programs... involving a high element of risk".

By 1984 the New York Foundation had distributed close to $44 million to an extraordinary variety of people and organizations. Challenging the status quo of the times, the Foundation was "willing to take calculated risks to assess local resources and mobilize and deliver them at the neighborhood level".

During the 1980s the Foundation's grantees included crisis intervention programs run by youth for youth, advocacy services for welfare recipients, and training classes for surrogate grandmothers working with disadvantaged mothers and their children. As always the Foundation was "guided by the belief that community residents had the will if not the means to make a difference in their own lives".

Today the New York Foundation is known as "a preeminent funder of grassroots groups". Since its founding the New York Foundation has given over $133 million to "a wide range of people and groups working in extraordinary circumstances. At the time of their 100th Anniversary celebration in 2009, more than half of the foundation's grants went to community organizing groups.

== Notable trustees ==
Name	Years active	Description
Alfred M. Heinsheimer	1909–1929	the brother of Louis Heinsheimer, had a degree in civil engineering from Columbia University. In addition to establishing the New York Foundation, Heinsheimer was a chief benefactor of the Hospital for Joint Diseases. He donated his summer home in Far Rockaway to the hospital; the site is now Bayswater State Park
Paul M. Warburg	1909–1932	banker and an economist and was instrumental in creating the Federal Reserve System. President Woodrow Wilson appointed him to the Federal Reserve Board, where he served as vice-governor in 1917 and 1918. Warburg's family bank, M. M. Warburg & Company in Hamburg, had been founded in 1798 and would last into the Hitler era, when it was forcibly confiscated in 1938 by non-Jews
Jacob H. Schiff	1909–1920	a German-born New York City banker and philanthropist, who helped finance, among many other things, the Japanese military efforts against Tsarist Russia in the Russo-Japanese War. From his base on Wall Street, he was the foremost Jewish leader in what later became known as the "Schiff era," grappling with all major issues and problems of the day, including the plight of Russian Jews under the tsar, American and international anti-Semitism, care of needy Jewish immigrants, and the rise of Zionism. He also became the director of many important corporations, including the National City Bank of New York, Equitable Life Assurance Society, Wells Fargo & Company, and the Union Pacific Railroad. In many of his interests he was associated with E.H. Harriman
Isaac N. Seligman	1909–1918	a banker and a graduate of Columbia University. He headed the firm of Seligman & Hellman. He was a trustee of numerous social reform organizations and chair of the Committee of Nine, which attempted reform of New York City's municipal government. He was also a member of the Ethical Culture Society
David M. Heyman	1912–1984	nephew of the original donor and a trustee since 1912 was elected president of the foundation in 1937. Heyman was an investment banker with wide-ranging interests in health and public policy. In the late 1930s, he developed financing plans for public housing of the federal government, and later helped implement them. He later served on the Senior Advisory Committee of the U.S. Public Health Service, helped create the Board of Hospitals, headed the New York City Commission on Health, and led a mayoral task force charged with raising standards for medical care, eradicating waste, closing obsolete facilities, and integrating municipal services with those provided by voluntary and private hospitals. He was a founder of the Health Insurance Plan of New York (HIP). His work to reshape the city's health services has influenced how millions of New Yorkers have received care over many decades
Felix M. Warburg	1912–1937	a member of the Warburg banking family of Hamburg, Germany, the brother of Paul Warburg, and a partner in Kuhn, Loeb & Company. He was a leader in the American Jewish Joint Distribution Committee raising funds for European Jews facing poverty after World War I
Lee K. Frankel	1914–1931	president of the American Public Health Association and headed the Welfare Division of the Metropolitan Life Insurance Company. He was a pioneer in the field of public health, particularly public health nursing
Paul J. Sachs	1914–1916	the son of Samuel Sachs, a partner in the investment firm Goldman Sachs. His mother was the daughter of the firm's founder Marcus Goldman. An art collector, Sachs left the investment firm in 1914 and joined the Fogg Art Museum. He was also a founding member of the Museum of Modern Art and donated its first drawing
Herbert H. Lehman	1920–1954	son of a founder of the Lehman Brothers investment banking firm – served as Governor of New York and then as U.S. Senator
Paul Baerwald	1931–1961	banker, was head of the Joint Distribution Group, and served under Franklin D. Roosevelt as the first Jewish representative to the Advisory Committee on Jewish Refugees.
Arthur Hays Sulzberger	1932–1960	publisher of The New York Times from 1935 to 1961. In 1929, he founded Columbia University's Jewish Advisory Board and served on the board of what became Columbia-Barnard Hillel, and served as a university trustee from 1944 to 1959. Sulzberger also served as a trustee of the Rockefeller Foundation from 1939 to 1957. In 1954, he received The Hundred Year Association of New York's Gold Medal Award in recognition of outstanding contributions to the City of New York
George G. Kirstein	1954–1959	publisher and principal owner of The Nation magazine, and a former health insurance executive
Lucille Koshland Heming	1956–1960	a political and civic volunteer. She served as President of the League of Women Voters in New York State. She was also the first president of the Carrie Chapman Catt Memorial Fund (later the Overseas Education Fund)
Edward M.M. Warburg	1959–1976	philanthropist and benefactor of the arts, was a founder of the Museum of Modern Art, and a founder of the American Ballet Company
George D. Woods	1959–1975	investment banker who served as President of the World Bank
J. Richardson Dilworth	1962–1966	Philanthropist and financier, former Chair of the Metropolitan Museum of Art and the Institute for Advanced Study, Princeton, New Jersey
William T. Golden	1963–1984	who was born in 1909, was a tour de force in American science. He discussed science policy with Albert Einstein, became a consultant to President Harry S. Truman, conceived the idea of a presidential science adviser, helped launch the National Science Foundation, and served as a key boardroom figure in nearly 100 medical schools, museums and universities
Fairfield Osborn	1963–1969	a leading conservationist and chairman of the board of the Bronx Zoo. He was the author of two books, Our Plundered Planet (1948), and The Limits of the Earth (1953)
Iphigene Ochs Sulzberger	1964–1968	associated with The New York Times beginning in 1896 when her father Adolph S. Ochs bought the paper at the age of 38. She was also an active supporter of parks, environmental conservation, education, libraries and the welfare of animals
Howard A. Rusk, M.D.	1966–1981	the father of rehabilitation medicine. Dr. Rusk founded Rusk Institute of Rehabilitation Medicine and the World Rehabilitation Fund. As an associate editor, he wrote a weekly medical column in The New York Times that appeared from 1946 to 1969
Kenneth B. Clark	1967–1980	an American social psychologist, Kenneth B. Clark was best known and most highly regarded black social scientist in the United States. Clark achieved international recognition for his research on the social and psychological effects of racism and segregation. His seminal work as a psychologist – including his 1940s experiments using dolls to study children's attitudes about race and his expert witness testimony in Briggs v. Elliott, a case rolled into Brown v. Board of Education – contributed to the 1954 U.S. Supreme Court ruling that declared school segregation unconstitutional. Dr. Clark was the first African American to serve on the New York State Board of Regents
John W. Gardner	1970–1976	was Secretary of Health, Education, and Welfare under President Lyndon Johnson, where he presided over the launching of Medicare and the creation of the Corporation for Public Broadcasting. He was also President of the Carnegie Corporation and the founder of two influential national U.S. organizations: Common Cause and Independent Sector. He received the Presidential Medal of Freedom in 1964
David A. Morse	1970–1982	as director general of the International Labour Organization, he accepted the Nobel Peace Prize for the United Nations affiliate in 1969. He also served as Acting United States Labor Secretary. Among Mr. Morse's awards were the United States Legion of Merit, the French Legion of Honor, the Order of Merit of the Republic of Italy, the Order of Merit of Labor of Brazil and the Human Rights Award of the International League for Human Rights
John E. Jacob	1983–1985	served as executive vice president-Global Communications for Anheuser-Busch Companies, Inc., and was the president of the National Urban League for several years. He has served on numerous boards including Anheuser Busch, Morgan Stanley, Coca-Cola Enterprises, Inc., NYNEX, Howard University, Legal Aid Society, Drucker Foundation, National Conference Board, and National Park Foundation
Angela Diaz, M.D.	1994–2002	is professor and vice chair of the Department of Pediatrics at Mount Sinai School of Medicine and Director of the Mount Sinai Adolescent Health Center. She is the president of The Children's Aid Society's board and chaired the National Advisory Committee on Children and Terrorism. She was a White House Fellow under President Clinton. She was named one of the Best Doctors in NY numerous times, and listed in America's Top Doctors and Guide to America's Top Pediatricians
Janice C. Simpson	1994–1996	the associate managing editor at Time Magazine for twenty years. She is currently an adjunct lecturer at CUNY's Graduate School of Journalism
Sayu Bhojwani	2002–2004, 2007 – present	was with Bloomberg Philanthropies and helped manage their philanthropy program for London, Europe and Asia at Bloomberg LP. She served under Michael Bloomberg as the first NYC Commissioner of the Mayor's Office of Immigrant Affairs. In 1996, Bhojwani founded South Asian Youth Action. She serves on the board of the New York Women's Foundation and on the advisory committee for the Charles H. Revson Fellowship
Ana Oliveira	2003–present	is the president and CEO of the New York Women's Foundation and former executive director of the Gay Men's Health Crisis. She has also worked for the Osborne Association, Samaritan Village in Queens, Lincoln Medical and Mental Health Center, and Kings County Hospital
Aida Rodriguez	2009–present	is a professor at The New School and was a founder of Hispanics in Philanthropy. She worked at the Rockefeller Foundation for ten years and served as it deputy director from 1997 through 1999

== Notable grantees by year ==
=== 1910s ===
- 1910: Henry Street Settlement
- 1910: Neurological Institute of New York
- 1911: Hebrew Sheltering and Immigrant Aid Society (HIAS)
- 1911: National Association for the Advancement of Colored People
- 1911: Travelers' Aid Society
- 1912: New York Heart Association
- 1912: Urban League
- 1913: Teachers College, Columbia University
- 1916: New York Infirmary Indigent for Women and Children

=== 1920s ===
- 1920: Mount Sinai Hospital
- 1921: National Tuberculosis Association
- 1922: Peabody College for Teachers
- 1922: Tuskegee Normal and Industrial Institute
- 1923: Fisk University
- 1927: Howard University

=== 1930s ===
- 1931: Frontier Nursing Service
- 1932: American Public Health Association
- 1932: Little Red School House
- 1933: American Friends Service Committee
- 1933: American Hospital Association
- 1933: Maternity Center Association
- 1935: New York City Department of Hospitals
- 1939: University in Exile

=== 1940s ===
- 1940: New York University Medical College
- 1940: Institute of the Pennsylvania Hospital
- 1940: New York Academy of Medicine
- 1940: Harvard Medical School
- 1941: American Prison Association
- 1943: Menninger Foundation
- 1943: Goodwill Industries
- 1944: Visiting Nurse Service of New York
- 1944: Health Insurance Plan of Greater New York
- 1944: University of Michigan School of Public Health
- 1944: Sydenham Hospital
- 1944: United Negro College Fund
- 1945: American Cancer Society
- 1945: American Psychiatric Association
- 1945: Harvard University Law School
- 1946: Rusk Institute
- 1946: New York State Psychiatric Institute
- 1947: Knickerbocker Hospital
- 1949: New York City Department of Health
- 1949: American Academy of Pediatrics

=== 1950s ===
- 1950: National Association for Mental Health
- 1950: New York Academy of Medicine
- 1953: Memorial Center for Cancer and Allied Diseases
- 1954: Polytechnic Institute of New York University
- 1954: Institute of Public Administration
- 1954: Fountain House
- 1955: National Association for Retarded Children
- 1957: Clarke School for the Deaf
- 1957: Cooper Union
- 1958: Lenox Hill Hospital
- 1958: Southern Regional Council
- 1959: Hamilton-Madison House

=== 1960s ===
- 1961: ASPIRA
- 1963: American Diabetes Association
- 1963: Manhattan Eye, Ear and Throat Hospital
- 1965: Accion International
- 1965: Operation Crossroads Africa
- 1966: Congress of Racial Equality
- 1966: Maimonides Medical Center
- 1966: Blythedale Children's Hospital
- 1967: Hunter College
- 1967: Judson Health Center
- 1967: American Social Health Association
- 1967: Southern Regional Council
- 1968: Legal Aid Society
- 1968: National Welfare Rights Organization
- 1968: Southern Student Organizing Committee
- 1969: Center for Community Change

=== 1970s ===
- 1971: Harlem School of the Arts
- 1971: Jazzmobile
- 1972: Floating Foundation of Photography
- 1972: Pratt Institute
- 1973: Lawyers' Committee for Civil Rights Under Law
- 1973: University of Pittsburgh
- 1973: Voter Education Project
- 1974: Center for Constitutional Rights
- 1974: INFORM, Inc.
- 1974: United Presbyterian Church in the USA
- 1975: Tougaloo College
- 1976: Asian American Legal Defense and Education Fund
- 1976: Urban Academy Laboratory High School
- 1977: New York Civil Liberties Union
- 1979: National Women's Health Network
- 1979: New Ballet School

=== 1980s ===
- 1980: St. Luke's-Roosevelt Hospital Center
- 1981: New York University Medical Center
- 1981: Outward Bound USA
- 1981: Teachers and Writers Collaborative
- 1984: Albert Einstein College of Medicine
- 1985: Community Healthcare Network
- 1986: 92nd Street Y
- 1986: Lutheran Medical Center
- 1989: New York AIDS Coalition
- 1989: Medicare Rights Center

=== 1990s ===
- 1992: Chinese Staff and Workers' Association
- 1992: United Community Centers
- 1997: Brown University
- 1997: Legal Information for Families Today
- 1999: Audre Lorde Project
- 1999: Ella Baker Center for Human Rights

=== 2000s ===
- 2001: Sustainable South Bronx
- 2005: Sikh Coalition
- 2005: Sylvia Rivera Law Project
- 2006: New York Civil Liberties Union
- 2007: Esperanza del Barrio
- 2007: New York Lawyers for the Public Interest
- 2008: Movement for Justice in el Barrio
- 2008: Picture the Homeless
- 2009: Brandworkers International

== In the Media ==
- "Small, Focused New York Foundation Should Serve as Grant-Making Model", Chronicle of Philanthropy Sept. 19, 2010
