= J. Doyle DeWitt =

American businessman (1902-1972)

John Doyle Dewitt

President of the Travelers Insurance Company
- In office 1952–1965

Personal details
- Born: June 25, 1902; Sully, Iowa, U.S.
- Died: December 27, 1972 (aged 70)
- Spouse: Marjorie Aileen Everett (m. 1927)
- Children: 2
- Education: Drake University (Honorary LLD)
- Profession: Businessman
- Known for: Political numismatics

Military service
- Allegiance: United States
- Branch/service: United States Navy
- Battles/wars: World War I

John Doyle DeWitt (June 25, 1902 – December 27, 1972) was an American businessman and a noted authority on American political numismatics.

DeWitt was born in Sully, Iowa, served in the Navy during World War I, and from 1921 to 1924 attended Drake University. He married Marjorie Aileen Everett on October 3, 1927, and with her had a son and daughter. DeWitt spent his working career with the Travelers Insurance Company, having joined in 1925 as a claims investigator, and then rising through the ranks until he became president (1952–1965), director, and ultimately chairman of the board. While president, he created the Travelers Weather Research Center, the world's first privately owned research institute for the scientific study of weather. He also served as a director of the Chase Manhattan Bank, the Hartford National Bank and Trust Company, Hartford Hospital, the Southern New England Telephone Company, and United Aircraft Corporation. He received an honorary LL.D. from Drake University in 1955.

Today DeWitt is best remembered for his monographs on American political history, and for his extraordinary collection of American presidential campaign memorabilia, which contained more than 25,000 individual pieces, and which he donated to the University of Hartford.

== Selected monographs ==
- Election medals of the campaign of 1844, 1943.
- Medalets of the presidential campaign of 1848, 1948.
- A Century of Campaign Buttons 1789–1889, 1959.
- America Goes To The Polls: Highlights of the Presidential Campaigns 1789–1960, 1960.
- Lincoln in Hartford, 1960.
- Alfred S. Robinson, Hartford numismatist, 1968.
