= Thomas F. Malone =

American geophysicist (1917-2013)

Thomas Francis Malone
- Born: May 3, 1917; Sioux City, Iowa, US
- Died: July 6, 2013 (aged 96); West Hartford, Connecticut, US

Academic background
- Education: South Dakota School of Mines and Technology; MIT
- Doctoral advisor: Bernhard Haurwitz

Academic work
- Institutions: MIT; Travelers Weather Research Center; University of Connecticut
- Notable students: James E. McDonald

Thomas Francis Malone (May 3, 1917 – July 6, 2013) was an American geophysicist best known for his contributions to atmospheric science and meteorology. His career ranged from a tenured academic appointment at the Massachusetts Institute of Technology, to a senior vice presidency at the Travelers Insurance Company, to dean of the graduate school at the University of Connecticut, then Director of the Holcomb Research Institute at Butler University, and finally Executive Scientist for the Connecticut Academy of Science and Engineering.

== Education and career ==
Malone was born in Sioux City, Iowa, and grew up on his parents' homestead in South Dakota. Impressed with the impact of weather on daily life, he wrote to the United States Weather Bureau to ask about career prospects in meteorology, and subsequently enrolled in the South Dakota School of Mines and Technology, from which he graduated with high honors in 1940. Having received a graduate scholarship at MIT, Malone was selected to train Naval and Air Force officers in weather forecasting for military operations, and eventually served as a special consultant to the 19th Weather Squadron at Payne Field in Cairo, Egypt. At the end of World War II, he returned to MIT and completed his doctorate in 1946.

In 1951, as an assistant professor at MIT, he was invited to edit the Compendium of Meteorology (1300 pages, 102 authors), which led to his appointment to the National Academy of Sciences (NAS) Committee on Meteorology, charged with framing national initiatives in meteorological research and education. In 1955, Malone left academia to direct the new Travelers Weather Research Center and oversee its long-term planning and research. Malone served as the center's director until 1957, and its research director from 1957-1964. Under Malone's direction, the center won the 1958 Gold Medal from the New York Board of Trade for its research. He remained with the Travelers until 1970, when he returned to academia as Dean of the Graduate School of the University of Connecticut.

In 1958, in his role as chair of the NAS Committee on Meteorology, the committee created its highly influential "Preliminary Plans for a National Institute for Atmospheric Research", which recommended a doubling of meteorological research and education in 1958, as well as the creation of the National Center for Atmospheric Research (where he later chaired the Board of Trustees). During this period, he also served as president of the American Meteorological Society and the American Geophysical Union. In 1963, he chaired a series of meetings that led to the Global Atmospheric Research Program (GARP) and, ultimately, to the World Climate Research Program.

Malone was an early activist in the field of climate change, warning as early as 1970 that "continued burning of fossil fuels will cause the earth's temperature to rise and create grave climate changes." This warning was repeated in the 1977 NAS Geophysics Research Board report "Energy and Climate", which he chaired, and which stated that our industrial civilization faces a "major decision... continued reliance on fossil fuel as principal sources of energy or invest research and engineering effort, and capital, that will make it possible to substitute other energy sources."

== Awards ==
Malone was a member of the National Academy of Sciences, and a Fellow of the American Academy of Arts and Sciences, American Association for the Advancement of Science, American Geophysical Union (AGU), American Meteorological Society (AMS), and New York Academy of Sciences. He received the American Institute of Aeronautics and Astronautics Robert M. Losey Atmospheric Sciences Award, the AMS Charles Franklin Brooks Award and Cleveland Abbe Award, the AGU Waldo E. Smith Medal, and the International Meteorological Organization Prize of the World Meteorological Organization.

== Selected works ==
- "Application of Statistical Methods in Weather Prediction", Proc. Natl. Acad. Sci. U.S.A. 41(11):806-815. 1955.
- "A National Institute for Atmospheric Research", Trans. American Geophys. Union. 40(2):95-111. 1958.
