= Jeff Lindor =

Haitian-American New York based entrepreneur and investor

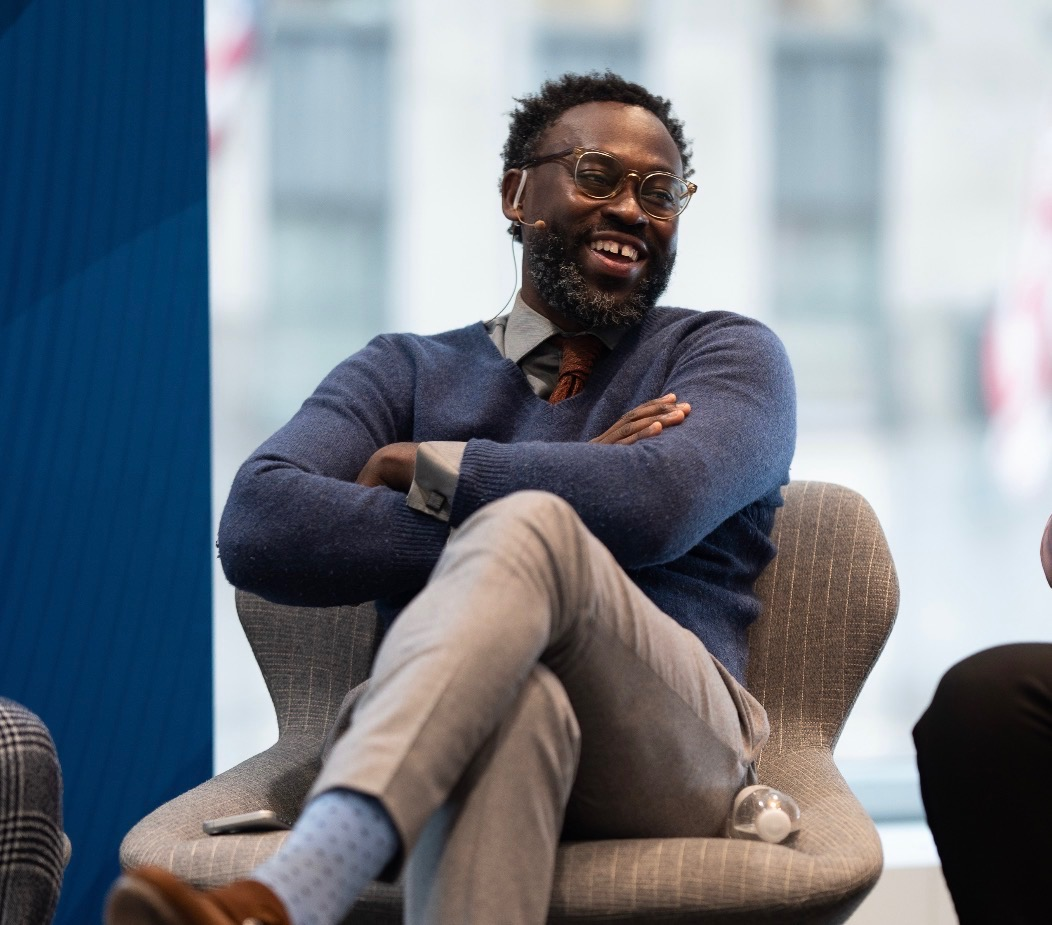
Jeff Lindor speaking at the National Black MBA 2025 Men's Conference in Rockefeller Center.

Jeff Lindor (born February 7, 1986) is a Haitian-American entrepreneur and community leader. He is the founder and CEO of the Gentlemen’s Factory Inc., a membership-based organization dedicated to empowering men of color.

== Early life and education ==
Jeff Lindor was born in Haiti in 1986. In 1989, he immigrated to the United States with his parents and two sisters, settling in Coney Island, Brooklyn. Lindor earned a Bachelor’s degree in History from the City University of New York and a Master’s degree in Urban Policy Analysis and Management from The New School.

== Career ==
Lindor began his professional career as a Personal Banker at JP Morgan Chase, where he gained experience in finance and business strategy. He later served as a Marketing Executive at EmblemHealth, where he led campaigns for the rollout of the Affordable Care Act, improving access to healthcare for underserved communities. During this time, he also oversaw the establishment of over a dozen community health facilities.

In the public sector, Lindor worked at the New York City Department of Correction, advising the Commissioner, the Mayor of New York City, and legislators on Rikers Island reform initiatives. His efforts contributed to the first phase of the island's closure, increased funding for work-release programs, and the passage of New York’s Raise the Age legislation.

=== Gentlemen's Factory ===
In 2014, Lindor founded the Gentlemen’s Factory, a membership community providing co-working spaces, think tanks, grooming stations, and incubators for men of color. With locations across New York City, the organization focuses on combating the isolation experienced by Black and Brown men and fostering personal and professional development.

Gentlemen’s Factory has become a hub for career advancement, entrepreneurship, and networking, connecting members to investors and resources. Under Lindor's leadership, the organization has partnered with the New York City Mayor’s Office for Criminal Justice to train justice-involved individuals for careers in technology and clean energy.

=== Community Involvement and Philanthropy ===
Lindor is an angel investor, supporting Black-owned startups, and actively raises funds for political candidates aligned with empowering Black and Brown communities. He also serves on the boards of the NYC Tech Alliance, Kingsborough Community College, the Brooklyn Chamber of Commerce, and the New York City Housing Authority.

== Personal life ==
Lindor lives in Brooklyn, New York, with his two children.
