= Committee on the Costs of Medical Care =

American health economics committee (1927–1932)

The Committee on the Costs of Medical Care (CCMC) was an investigative committee formed in 1927 to study the rising costs of physician and hospital care in the United States. Over its five-year span, the CCMC published dozens of reports studying the American health care system, including studies of Americans' medical costs. In 1932, the CCMC published its final report, Medical Care for the American People, which controversially recommended widespread adoption of health insurance.

== Founding ==
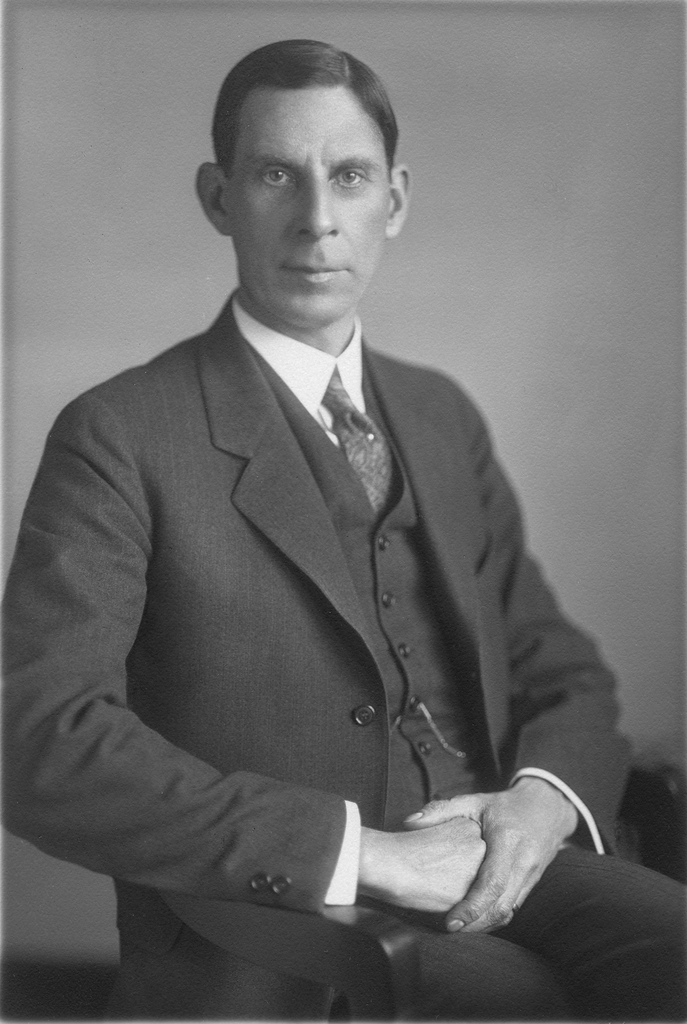
Ray Lyman Wilbur served as Chairman of the CCMC during its five-year tenure.

On April 1, 1925, fifteen delegates at the 1926 American Medical Association (AMA) convention formed a Conference on the Economic Factors Affecting the Organization of Medicine to study the medical economics of the United States. The group became known as the "Committee of Five" due to the dominance of Johns Hopkins Hospital Director Winford Henry Smith, Johns Hopkins School of Medicine Professor Lewellys F. Barker, Brookings Institution economist Walton Hale Hamilton, Yale School of Public Health Professor Charles-Edward Amory Winslow, and health policy analyst Michael M. Davis. After assigning Stanford University President Ray Lyman Wilbur (formerly President of the AMA) to preside over their meeting to prepare recommendations for the 1927 AMA convention, the group decided to form a five-year Committee on the Costs of Medical Care with Wilbur as its chairman.

The CCMC was fully financed through $750,000 in contributions from eight charitable organizations, including the Milbank Memorial Fund, Rockefeller Foundation, Carnegie Foundation, New York Foundation, and Rosenwald Fund.

== Findings ==
Studying the health care expenses of 9,000 American families, the CCMC found that low-income households had similar expenditures, regardless of how many children they had, indicating that families budget a consistent share of their earnings toward medical costs. This finding suggested that for most families, suddenly requiring expensive specialized medical care would lead to financial disaster if they lacked health insurance. Observing that the prevalence of recorded illness increased alongside household income, the CCMC concluded that financial access to the American health care system was offering better diagnostic services to the upper-class. Furthermore, the average expense for hospitalized illnesses also increased alongside household income, reinforcing the idea that the American health care system offered additional treatment to the upper-class.

By 1932, the CCMC had published dozens of reports, many authored in collaboration with other organizations like the AMA and American Dental Association (ADA). Unable to agree on recommendations for its final report, the group summarized its findings in its November 1932 Medical Care for the American People report overseen by Associate Director of Study Isidore Falk, followed by a series of Minority Reports representing the views of its dissenters. The majority's report recommended that comprehensive medical care should be organized around high-quality hospitals, public health services should be extended to the entire population through dedicated financing and staffing, medical costs should be distributed across the population through insurance and/or taxation, state and local governments should evaluate and coordinate their medical services, and medical professionals should be highly trained.

Under the majority's proposal, cities with at least 15,000 residents should have at least one non-profit community medical center, smaller towns with at least 2,500 residents should have a branch hospital affiliated with the nearest medical center, and rural areas should have a local medical station. Rare diseases would be addressed through traveling clinics.

In comparison, the CCMC's Minority Reports argued that the government should only offer medical care to the impoverished and Armed Forces, though they agreed with the government's role in coordinating public health campaigns. The minority claimed that elevating general practitioners over other health care professionals and eliminating corporate ownership of medical facilities would lower costs. On the other hand, Hamilton and economist Edgar Sydenstricker felt that the majority should have adopted the Bismarck model of financing health care through compulsory insurance.

== Reception ==
The AMA and Journal of the American Medical Association (JAMA) editor Morris Fishbein endorsed the Minority Reports, framing the majority's proposals as radically imposing a socialist mandate to purchase health insurance, rather than retaining a capitalistic free market of voluntary insurance. The New York Times front-page summary of the CCMC's final report was "Socialized Medicine is Urged in Survey", an interpretation reinforced by The Wall Street Journal, New York Herald Tribune, Boston Evening Transcript and The Washington Star.

While lame duck US President Herbert Hoover praised the CCMC's work ahead of the final report's unveiling at the New York Academy of Medicine's National Conference on Medical Costs, incoming President Franklin D. Roosevelt felt that the political debate over the CCMC's findings would make it impossible to propose health care reforms during his first term. Nonetheless, the 1935 Social Security Act funded grants for states to undertake public health programs, partially embracing the CCMC's recommendations.

New York State Commissioner of Health Thomas Parran represented then-New York Governor Roosevelt at the report's unveiling. Winslow presented the majority's recommendations, physician Nathan B. Van Etten explained the minority's recommendations, Barker represented the viewpoint of physicians, and Cornell University President Livingston Farrand expressed the viewpoint of public health officials.

== Legacy ==
On the 25th and 40th anniversaries of the CCMC's final report, Falk published retrospective articles analyzing how the group's recommendations have continued to shape American health care policy. The 2010 Affordable Care Act ultimately embraced the CCMC's emphasis on widespread health insurance through the individual shared responsibility provision, which fined individuals if they refused to purchase health insurance.
