= Public Health Research Institute =

Research institute founded 1942

The Public Health Research Institute (PHRI) was founded in 1942 by New York City's mayor, Fiorello La Guardia, who appointed David M. Heyman to lead it as an independent not-for-profit research organization. In the late 1980s it was referred to as Public Health Research Institute – New York In 2002, they moved to Newark, New Jersey. PHRI became part of the New Jersey Medical School in 2006 and since 2013 it has been part at Rutgers University.

== Mission ==
Their mission is still, as stated in the institute's first annual report, to serve "pressing demands of a large population" as "a vast manufacturing and dignostic enterprise." Dr. Ralph Muckenfuss, director of the Bureau of Laboratories of the Department of Health, was designated as director of the institute during the war period.

== History ==
=== New York City ===
The 1942-founded PHRI was initially housed in the New York City Department of Health's Laboratories; the latter preceded the turn of the nineteenth century.

The institute's mission was to conduct research on public health issues affecting New York City. The Institute had three divisions—Infectious Disease, Applied Immunology, and Nutrition and Physiology (which later became the Division of Biochemistry). The institute was originally housed in simple quarters at 16th Street and the East River. As it grew in size the Institute eventually moved to a new building at 26th Street and First Avenue, across the street from the original Carnegie Laboratory of New York University. The Institute maintained close connections with NYU with most of the staff holding faculty appointments at the university.

PHRI was unique in being the only basic medical research organization in the nation that received substantial municipal support. Originally the City contributed $100,000 per year. Over time this increased to $350,000 per year with New York State contributing the same amount. This arrangement continued until the financial crisis of 1977 forced both the city and the state to end their funding for the institute. The Institute survived this loss of funding and continued to operate with funding from the National Institutes of Health and other research funders.

=== Newark ===
The transition after 60 years in New York City to the New Jersey–based Public Health Research Institute at the International Center for Public Health was initiated in 2002, when PHRI became associated with the University of Medicine and Dentistry of New Jersey and moved to the International Center for Public Health (IPCH) in University Heights in Newark, New Jersey, a building which it shared with the UMDNJ Department of Microbiology and Molecular Genetics and the National Tuberculosis Center. PHRI operated independently until 2006 when it merged with UMDNJ and was established as a research center of the university and New Jersey Medical School. PHRI researchers now hold faculty positions in the departments of medicine, microbiology, biochemistry and molecular genetics of New Jersey Medical School. In 2013, UMDNJ and Rutgers merged to form Rutgers Biomedical and Health Sciences.

== See also ==
- Public Health Unit
- Rockefeller University
