= Jay S. Fishman =

American business executive (1952–2016)

Jay Fishman
- Born: November 4, 1952; New York City, New York, U.S.
- Died: August 19, 2016 (aged 63); New Jersey, United States
- Education: University of Pennsylvania
- Occupation: business executive

Jay Steven Fishman (November 4, 1952 – August 19, 2016) was chairman and chief executive officer of The Travelers Companies for 11 years prior to stepping down in December 2015, following a diagnosis of ALS. He was employed as the executive chairman of the board of Travelers from December 2015 until his death in August 2016.

== Education ==
Fishman was born in New York City in 1952. He received a master's degree in accounting from the Wharton School of Business and graduated with a bachelor's degree in economics, magna cum laude, from the University of Pennsylvania.

== Career ==
From 1989 to October 2001, Fishman held several key executive posts at Commercial Credit Corp., Primerica, Travelers, and Citigroup.

Fishman was chairman and CEO of TRV since a merger between The St. Paul Companies, Inc. (where Fishman had been chairman, CEO, and president) and Travelers Companies (then-CEO Robert I. Lipp) first formed TRV in April 2004.

Prior to October 2001, Fishman was chairman, CEO, and president of The Travelers Insurance Group, Inc., (which became Travelers Property Casualty Corp. in 2002 and merged with a subsidiary of St. Paul in 2004) and as CEO and president of Travelers Property Casualty Corp. (which became Travelers Insurance Group Holdings Inc. in 2002) also as chairman of holdings from March 2000 to January 2001.

While CEO of The Travelers Companies in 2008, Fishman earned a total compensation of $16,821,125, which included a base salary of $1,000,000; a cash bonus of $5,000,000, stock granted of $7,199,977; options granted of $2,998,547; and other compensation of $622,601.

Fishman worked at the University of Pennsylvania, as a member of the board of trustees, the board of overseers of the Graduate School of Education, and the industry advisory board of the Financial Institutions Center for The Wharton School. He also wason the board of directors of the National Academy Foundation. He was an honored member of the Advisory Committee of the Jazz Foundation of America.

In June 2012, Fishman was named chairman of the board of directors of New York City Ballet. He was on the board of the Lincoln Center for the Performing Arts. He is a trustee of the New York-Presbyterian Hospital and a director of Exxon Mobil Corporation.

On August 4, 2015, Fishman announced he was stepping down as CEO due to his battle with the progressive neurological disease amyotrophic lateral sclerosis, better known as Lou Gehrig's Disease. He died on August 19, 2016, in New Jersey.

== Personal ==
Fishman was married to Randy Lee Chapman in 1976. They had two sons and three grandchildren, and Fishman had a sister, surviving at the time of his death. His wife also survived him.
