= Family Legal Care =

U.S. non-profit organization

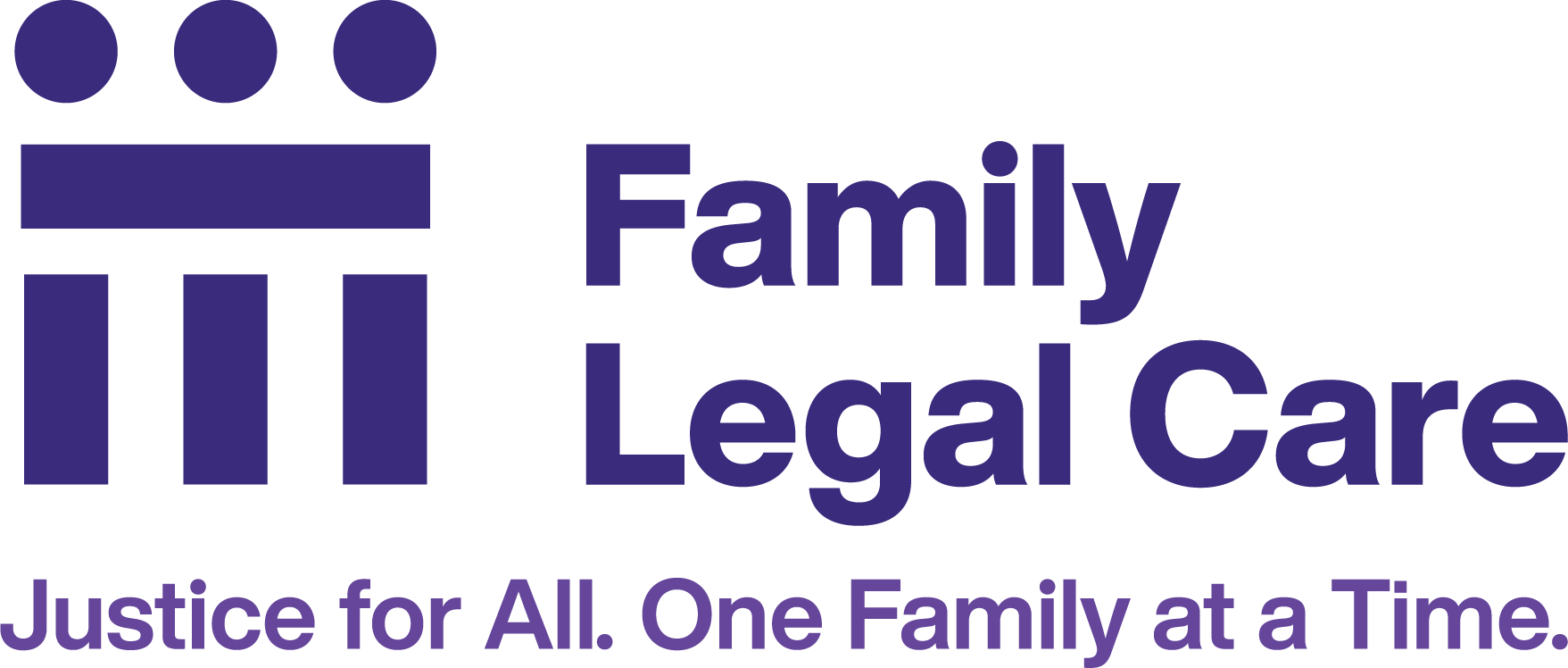
- Founded: 1996
- Type: Community-Based Nonprofit Organization
- Tax ID no.: 13-3910567
- Location: Brooklyn, New York
- Revenue: US$3,000,000
- Employees: 20
- Volunteers: 50+
- Website: familylegalcare.org

Family Legal Care (formerly Legal Information for Families Today) is a non-profit organization that provides legal information and advice to unrepresented litigants so that they can successfully self-advocate in New York State Family Courts.

== History ==
Family Legal Care was launched in 1996, when three lawyers established "go-to" locations in New York City's Family Courts that provided on-the-spot help and legal information for vulnerable families struggling to make their way through the City's complex Family Court system. Before Family Legal Care, there was no source of information or guidance for families in the City's Family Courts, and the type of on-the-spot service Family Legal Care offered was immediately in-demand and has served as the foundation for their programmatic growth throughout the organization's history.

== Awards ==
Family Legal Care has been recognized for the following awards:

- 2009: Family Legal Care was a finalist for the New York Times Company Nonprofit Excellence Award, given to the nonprofit that best exhibits excellence in management and that plays a critical role in enriching and improving the lives of people in New York City.
- 2009: Family Legal Care received the Thom A. Fluellen Award from the NYU Community Fund, which recognizes an outstanding organization that demonstrates tireless efforts in the community.
- 2008: Family Legal Care received The Samuel J. Duboff Memorial Award from the Fund for Modern Courts. The award recognizes non-lawyers who make extraordinary contributions toward improving the quality of justice in New York State.
- 2005: Family Legal Care's Family Court-based Education & Information Sites were recognized as an "exemplary" court program by the Association of Family and Conciliation Courts.

== See also ==
- The New York Foundation
