= Travelers Weather Research Center =

Privately-owned weather research institute

The Travelers Weather Research Center (1954-1961) was the world's first privately owned research institute for the scientific study of weather. It pioneered the use of statistical methods, mathematical models, and computers to improve weather forecasting techniques, and was the first to state weather predictions in terms of probabilities ("20% chance of rain").

The Travelers Weather Research Center was established by J. Doyle DeWitt, president of the Travelers Insurance Company, to more accurately estimate weather phenomena with relation to property damage, crop losses, and accidents. In 1955, the center hired Dr. Thomas F. Malone from MIT to direct the center and oversee its long-term planning and research. Malone served as the center's director until 1957, and its research director from 1957-1964; he remained with the Travelers until 1970. Under Malone's direction, the center won the 1958 Gold Medal from the New York Board of Trade for its research. In the same year, he chaired a national committee that created "Preliminary Plans for a National Institute for Atmospheric Research", which resulted in establishment of the National Center for Atmospheric Research.

In 1961, the Travelers Weather Research Center was subsumed into a new Travelers subsidiary, The Travelers Research Corporation, in anticipation of forthcoming federal regulations controlling air quality. In 1969, the subsidiary was incorporated as the Research Corporation of New England, also known as TRC, which continues to this day.
