= New American Leaders =

Pro-immigrant political advocacy group in the US

- Formation: 2010
- Founder: Sayu Bhojwani
- Region served: United States
- Website: www.newamericanleaders.org

New American Leaders is a nonprofit organization that recruits people of immigrant heritage to run for elected office in the United States.

== Programs ==
Through "Ready to Win", New American Leaders recruits first- and second-generation Americans to run for public office, and provides training to help get them elected including topics such as fundraising, navigating campaigns, and leveraging their identities to connect with broad voter bases. The training includes discussions of American values, identity, and xenophobia. The goal of electing officials with immigrant heritage is to elevate the discussion of immigration in the United States, and for elected officials to reflect the reality that one in four U.S. citizens is an immigrant or a child of immigrants.

According to the organization's 2019 study of the American Community Survey, naturalized citizens make up hundreds of thousands of eligible voters in so-called swing states and could prove influential in presidential elections.

== History ==
New American Leaders was founded in 2010 by Sayu Bhojwani.

From 2011 to 2015, 33 alumni of its trainings ran for elected office, of whom ten won their races, and others took positions in public service.

In 2016, the organization led its first all-female training in New York.

In 2018, nearly 50 alumni ran for public office across the country, of whom 18 won their races in state assemblies, city councils and school boards. Catalina Cruz credits the training as having helped her raise nearly $200,000 in her successful primary bid for New York State Assembly representing Jackson Heights, Queens in 2018, becoming the first DREAMer elected to that legislative body.

As of April 2019, the organization had trained more than 600 candidates in eight states, not only focusing on political races where the racial composition is favorable to a particular minority.

In September 2019, the organization launched "Boss Ladies" trainings for young women to serve as staff on political campaigns.

In January 2020, New American Leaders received a three-year grant of $1.5 million from the Ascend Fund to recruit and train women candidates.

== Notable alumni ==
- Isela Blanc
- Stephanie Chang
- Catalina Cruz
- Carlos Menchaca
