= Ralph Muckenfuss =

Biology research scientist, focused on DNA

Ralph Stewart Muckenfuss (3 February 1899 – 13 March 1979) was an American scientist who served as the first director of The Public Health Research Institute of The City of New York. He temporarily left during World War II "to take on important duties with the American armed forces."

== Career ==
"Starting around 1929," Muckenfuss served as the Missouri hospital's lab director.

In 1935, he accepted an invitation from New York City's Department of Health to become its "temporary assistant director of the city's Bureau of Laboratories." The New York Times reported that it was a "Job Local Doctors Refused," and Muckenfuss had a position as a bacteriologist at Washington University in St. Louis. By 1947, he had become director. By 1953, he moved to the parent body and held the title of "assistant commissioner of the Health Department." He remained in this role throughout the 1960s but never became the commissioner.

During a smallpox crisis in New York in 1947, Muckenfuss took the initiative to contact "officials of three drug companies over the weekend, requesting them to start maximum production." The mayor entrusted him with managing the situation.
