= Doron Kochavi =

Israeli lawyer and philanthropist (born 1951)

- דורון כוכבי
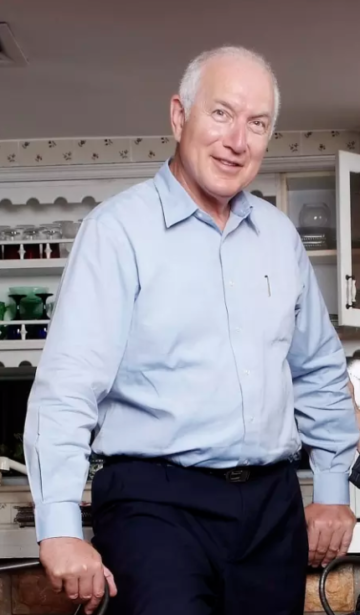
- Born: 4 September 1951 (age 74); Tel Aviv
- Education: Tel Aviv University
- Occupation: Lawyer
- Years active: 1982–present
- Children: Amit L. Kochavi (son)
- Relatives: David M. Heyman (grandfather)
- Family: Glaser-Kochavi family

Doron Kochavi (Hebrew: דורון כוכבי; born 4 September 1951) is an Israeli lawyer, businessperson and philanthropist.

Kochavi is the founder of the partnership between the cities of Tel Aviv and Los Angeles.

== Early life ==
Doron Kochavi was born in Tel Aviv into the Buchman family, a prominent business family. He completed his Bachelors in Sociology in 1976 and his law degree in 1979 from Tel Aviv University. He further studied for a combined degree in Law and Business Administration, completing it in 1982.

== Career ==
Doron Kochavi started his career as a legal intern in the District Court of Tel Aviv under Judge Lowenberg. Later he worked in real estate and property law, real estate development, commercial law, bankruptcy and litigation in Israel representing both private ad publicly traded companies. After completing his military service, Tel Aviv Mayor Shlomo "Chich" Lahat appointed him manager Hadar Yosef neighborhood. He served as a court-appointed trustee to oversee the development of the public areas of north Tel Aviv and Gush Hagadol.

Kochavi served as the Legal Advisor of Alumayer Group. The largest Aluminum supplier in Israel which built Ben Gurion Airport, Menora Mivtachim Arena and many more significant projects around Israel and the world.

In 1994, a statutory committee of the Finance and Agricultural Ministries appointed Kochavi as an advisor to Knesset sub-committee that exposed the Israeli market to imports. He was also a rehabilitator 40+ "moshavim" (cooperative settlements) authorized by a District Court judge.

Mr. Kochavi is known as one of the biggest developers of the Gush HaGadol Area. He has built over 20 buildings and represents hundreds of right holders.

Kochavi is an owner of "Beyond Towers", together with Tidhar Group and George Horesh, that will be built on the border of Tel Aviv and Givatayim by Tidhar. "Beyond Towers" project is estimated at US$1.5 Billion project. The highest commercial building in Israel.

He's also a co-owner and board member of "Hi Tower" project on the border of Tel Aviv and Givatayim. The highest residential tower in Israel.

== Philanthropy ==
Kochavi is an Executive Director of the Buchman Heyman Foundation founded by his grandmother in 1942 to help needy people all over Israel.

The Buchman Heyman Foundation supports Israel Philharmonic Orchestra, Tel Aviv Museum of Art, Habima Theatre, Beit Zvi, The Jaffa Institute, Tel Aviv University, Open University of Israel, Yad Vashem, Hebrew University of Jerusalem and many more institutions in Israel. The foundation gives several grants to young artists, actresses, students throughout every year.

Kochavi is a co-founder the Tel Aviv-Los Angeles partnership that started in 1997. He became a member of the Steering Committee as well as the chairman of the Tel Aviv Education Committee of the partnership and served up till 2003.

Kochavi has been a board member of the Israeli Forum in 1980s.

Kochavi serves on the Board of Governors of Tel Aviv University and Open University of Israel.

He also serves as a board member of The Herb and Sharon Glaser Foundation (Israel), The Buchman Heyman Foundation (Israel), Friends of the Diaspora Museum, Trustee of The Ohela Halevy Foundation, Chairman of the steering committee of Friends of Mercaz HaMusica and the founding chairman of the Friends of Ghetto Fighter's House.

== Personal life ==
Kochavi is married to Tamar Glaser Kochavi, a film producer and a great-granddaughter of Max Factor Sr. He is the father of Shir and Amit L. Kochavi.
