= Esperanza del Barrio =

American non-profit organization

Esperanza del Barrio is a non-profit, grassroots organization of Mexican/Latin@ street vendors in New York City. The organization is located in East Harlem ("El Barrio"), on 117th St and 2nd Avenue. Founded in February 2003 by five female Mexican street vendors, EdB campaigns for economic access for its street vendor members, which currently number over 600. The vendor-members sell street food or other goods, such as fresh flowers and toys. They work and live all over the city, especially in Upper Manhattan, Queens, and the Bronx. Esperanza del Barrio also provides ESL classes, video production classes, after-school tutoring for children, a youth group, and a legal clinic. In 2005, Esperanza del Barrio succeeded in passing legislation (Intro 491-A) in City Council that removes the necessity of showing working papers to receive a personal vending license from the NYC Department of Consumer Affairs. The organization is currently fighting to remove the cap on general pushcart permits. Esperanza del Barrio is a core member of the Street Vendors for Justice Coalition.

== See also ==
- The New York Foundation
