= Paul Baerwald =

German-born Jewish-American banker and philanthropist

- Born: September 27, 1871; Frankfurt am Main, Germany
- Died: July 2, 1961 (aged 89); Long Branch, New Jersey, U.S.
- Occupations: Banker, philanthropist
- Known for: Chairman of the American Jewish Joint Distribution Committee
- Spouse: Edith Jacobi (m. 1909)
- Children: Pauline Frances, Herman Frederick, Jane, Florence

Paul Baerwald (September 27, 1871 – July 2, 1961) was a German-born Jewish-American banker and philanthropist.

== Early life and family ==
Baerwald was born on September 27, 1871, in Frankfurt-on-Main, Germany, the son of Dr. Herman Baerwald and Selma Frenkel.

== Career ==
Baerwald began working in the banking business with Lazard-Speyer-Ellissen in Frankfurt from 1886 to 1891. He then worked for Speyer Brothers in London from 1891 to 1896. From 1896 to 1906, he worked with Speyer and Company in New York City. He then worked as a partner in Lazard Frères until 1930, when he retired from banking to focus on entirely on philanthropic and communal endeavors. He was also chairman of the executive committee of Fidelity-Phoenix Fire Insurance Co., executive committee member of the Fire Building Corporation, director of the General American Investors Corporation, advisory committee member of the Texas Pacific Land Trust.

== Charitable work and affiliations ==
Baerwald's involvement in Jewish communal work began in 1917, when his close friend Felix M. Warburg asked him to become associate treasurer of the American Jewish Joint Distribution Committee (JDC). He became treasurer of the JDC in 1920, and in 1932 he became its chairman. In 1938, he joined President Roosevelt's Advisory Committee on Political Refugees, which tried to find ways to aid Nazi victims. He supervised the JDC's rescue work during World War II, risking its credit by sending money to Europe that had to be borrowed from New York banks. A high percentage of the War Refugee Board funds from 1944 to 1945 came from the JDC under Baerwald's direction. His financial policy continued during the post-war years, when the JDC aided over half a million refugees to reach Israel.

Baerwald became honorary chairman of the JDC in 1945. In 1949, the JDC opened the Paul Baerward School, a social work named after him, in Versailles, France. The school was transferred to Israel in 1958. He was a trustee and treasurer of the New York Foundation, a voting trustee of the Palestine Economic Corporation, treasurer of the Wollman Foundation, and trustee and treasurer of the Solomon and Betty Loeb Convalescent Home. He served the United Jewish Appeal as a member of the national campaign executive committee, director and vice-chairman of the Appeal in New York, and as honorary chairman of its 1946 campaign. He was also treasurer of the American Society for Jewish Farm Settlements in Russia and the American Jewish Joint Agricultural Corporation.

Baerwald was a member of the Harmonie Club.

== Personal life and death ==
In 1909, he married Edith Jacobi. Their children were Pauline Frances, Herman Frederick, Jane, and Florence.

Baerwald died in Monmouth Memorial Hospital in Long Branch, New Jersey, following a short illness on July 2, 1961. At the time, he was in his summer home in Elberon. 500 people attended his funeral. He was buried in Mount Pleasant Cemetery in Westchester County.
