= Brandworkers =

- Founded: 2007
- Type: Workers Rights, Non-profit
- Location: New York City, United States
- Services: Workplace Organizing Training
- Affiliations: Progressive International
- Website: Brandworkers.org

Brandworkers is a non-profit organization of food factory workers building a union with the Industrial Workers of the World. Through co-workers uniting, food factory workers are organizing to win dignified jobs and build power across the industry. Based in New York City, Brandworkers was founded in 2007 by a group of retail and food employees engaged with workers' rights issues. Brandworkers trains workers in the use of social change tools to achieve employer compliance with the law and improve working conditions.

== Issues ==
Brandworkers campaigns and services are focused on the issues of wage theft, including minimum wage & overtime; immigrant labor; employment discrimination; occupational health & safety; workers compensation; and the right to organize.

== Campaigns ==
Brandworkers has assisted workers organizing against wage theft and discrimination at food manufacturing companies and warehouses, including campaigns at Wild Edibles, Pur Pac and Flaum Appetizing, winning a number of settlements over unpaid wages.

== See also ==
- The New York Foundation
- Industrial Workers of the World
