= Karen Ignagni =

Health insurance industry lobbyist, executive

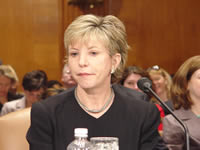
- Ignagni testifying in the United States Senate, April 21, 2005.
- Born: 1954 (age 71–72)
- Occupations: Executive Board Chair, EmblemHealth
- Years active: 1993–present

Karen Ignagni (born 1954) is an American health care executive and lobbyist who is the Executive Board Chair of EmblemHealth. From September 2015 to January 2025, she was the company’s President and Chief Executive Officer. Prior to that, she was the President and Chief Executive Officer of America's Health Insurance Plans (AHIP), formerly HIAA (Health Insurance Association of America). She is often mentioned as one of the most effective lobbyists and the most powerful people in healthcare. She is involved in health care reform in the United States, working to benefit health insurance companies.

== Background ==
Ignagni grew up in Providence with her brother Robert, where her father was a fireman and mother worked at the city hall. She graduated from the Providence College, where she majored in political science, and from Loyola College Executive MBA program.

Ignagni led the American Association of Health Plans (AAHP) from 1993 until 2003 when it merged with the Health Insurance Association of America. Before joining AAHP, she was a director of the AFL-CIO's Department of Employee Benefits. Previously she worked in the U.S. Senate Labor and Human Resources Committee, the U.S. Department of Health and Human Services, and as a staffer for Senator Claiborne Pell.

Ignagni wrote articles on health care policy issues in The New York Times, USA Today, the New York Daily News, and New England Journal of Medicine, among others. She sits advisory groups and boards including the Board of the National Academy of Social Insurance, the Partnership for Prevention, and the Bryce Harlow Foundation.

=== Recognition ===
She received the Second Century Award for Excellence in Health Care. George Magazine listed her among 50 Most Powerful People in Politics. The New York Times wrote in 1999 that "in a city teeming with health care lobbyists, Ms. Ignagni is widely considered one of the most effective. She blends a detailed knowledge of health policy with an intuitive feel for politics." The Hill newspaper included her among Washington's most effective lobbyists in 2004. She is also an occasional object of derision, such as when Health Care for America Now group awarded Ignagni a "protector of profits" award.
