= Alan D. Schnitzer =

American lawyer and businessman

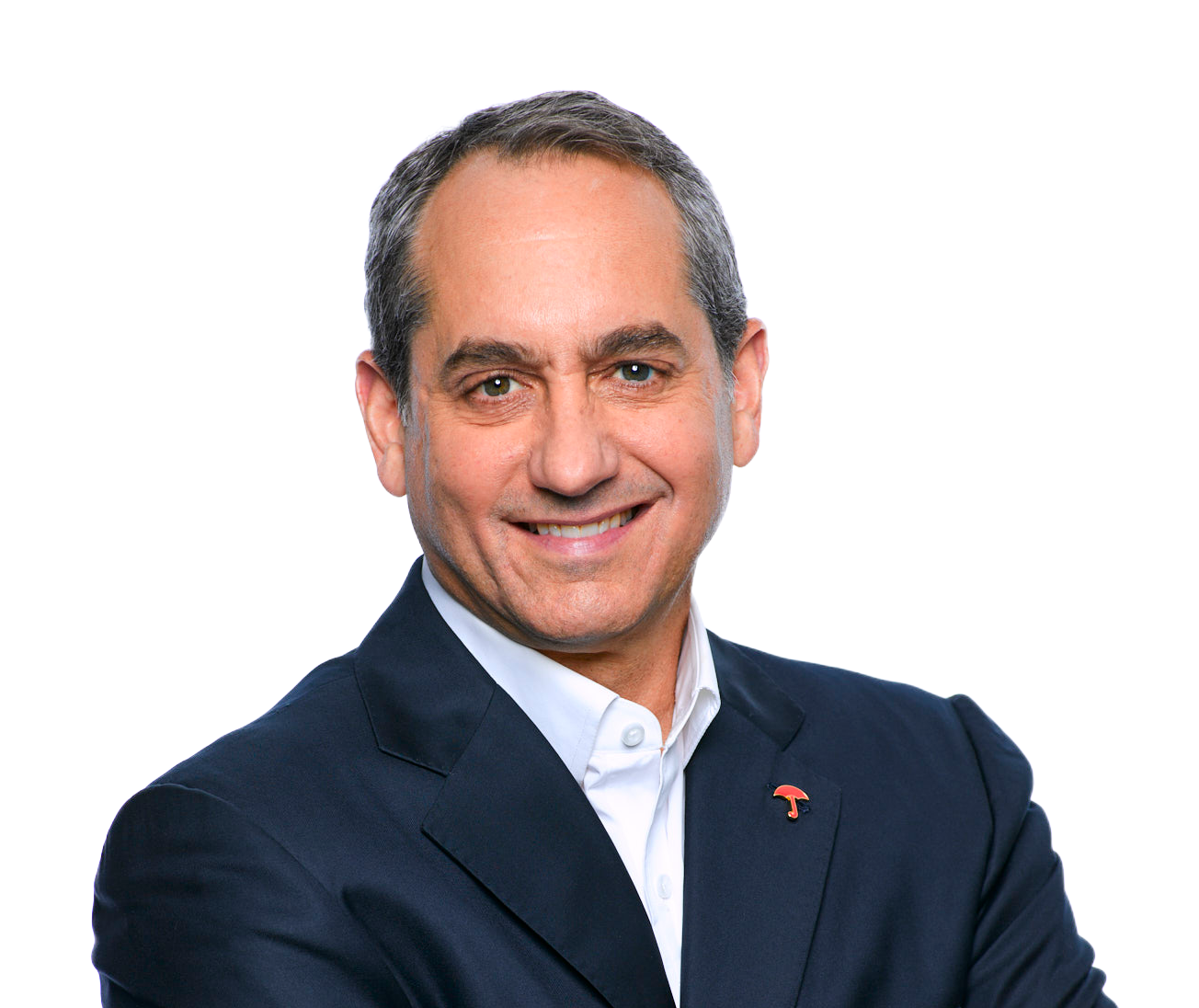
- Born: 1965 (age 60–61)
- Education: University of Pennsylvania (BA); Columbia University (JD)
- Occupations: Chairman & CEO, The Travelers Companies
- Spouse: Anne Berman
- Children: 2

Alan D. Schnitzer (born in1965) is an American executive who is the chairman and chief executive officer at The Travelers Companies, Inc., a provider of property casualty insurance for auto, home and business.

== Education ==
Schnitzer received a bachelor's degree from the University of Pennsylvania and his Juris Doctor (J.D.) from Columbia Law School.

== Career ==
Schnitzer became a partner in the law firm Simpson Thacher & Bartlett LLP early in his career. During that time he advised on the merger of Travelers with the St. Paul Companies in 2004.

In 2007 Schnitzer joined Travelers as vice chairman and chief legal officer and was on the company's management committees. In July 2014, he was named chief executive officer of business and international insurance, overseeing areas such as field management, corporate communications, and public policy.

Schnitzer became chief executive officer of Travelers in December 2015, and was elected chairman of the board in August 2017. In 2024, Schnitzer's total compensation was $23.1 million.

== Advisory positions ==
Schnitzer is a trustee at the University of Pennsylvania, the New York City Ballet, and Memorial Sloan Kettering Cancer Center. Additionally he is the chair of the American Property Casualty Insurance Association.

Schnitzer is a member of The Business Council, the Business Roundtable, and the Council on Foreign Relations. Previously he was on the U.S. Securities and Exchange Commission’s Investor Advisory Committee created under the Dodd-Frank Act.

== Personal life ==
Schnitzer married Anne Berman, step-daughter of Robert Lipp in 1994. They met while both attended the University of Pennsylvania and have two children.
