= David M. Heyman =

American financier

David Melville Heyman
- Born: August 29, 1891
- Died: January 7, 1984 (aged 92)
- Education: Mohegan Lake Military Academy; Cornell University; Columbia University (BA)
- Occupations: Financier, health services leader, philanthropist, art collector
- Known for: Founder of: Public Health Research Institute (1942); Health Insurance Plan of Greater New York (1944); Heyman Center for the Humanities at Columbia University (1981)
- Spouse: Ruth Stein
- Children: 3
- Relatives: Solomon Loeb (great-uncle); Doron Kochavi (grandson); Amit L. Kochavi (great-grandson)

David Melville Heyman (August 29, 1891 – January 7, 1984) was an American financier, health services leader, philanthropist, and art collector. Heyman founded the Public Health Research Institute of the City of New York in 1942 and the Health Insurance Plan of Greater New York in 1944, and served as the president of the New York Foundation for thirty years.

== Early life and education ==
David Heyman was born in 1891 to Simon and Bella Heyman (née Heinsheimer), who is a daughter of Natalie Heinsheimer (née Loeb), sister of financier Solomon Loeb, founder of Kuhn, Loeb & Co. He attended Mohegan Lake Military Academy in Westchester County, New York. In 1909, he went to Cornell University, but transferred later to Columbia University and graduated in 1913.

== Career ==
After graduating from college, he started his career on Wall Street as an office boy earning $5 a week, and joined the board of his family foundation, the New York Foundation, later serving as its President from 1937 to 1966. Within five years of becoming an office boy, he had advanced to earning $25,000 a year as an investment banker. His career as an investment banker began at Kuhn, Loeb & Co., where his uncle, Louis A. Heinsheimer, was a partner, and finished 35 years later as a partner at Lewisohn & Company. Heyman career was interrupted when he joined the Army as a lieutenant when World War I broke out.

In 1942, Heyman founded the Public Health Research Institute as an independent not-for-profit research organization affiliated with the New York City Department of Health.

In 1943, New York City mayor Fiorello LaGuardia and Heyman convened a panel to explore the feasibility of offering pre-paid medical services to New Yorkers of "moderate means." That panel led to the incorporation of the Health Insurance Plan of Greater New York (HIP) in 1944 as the first health insurance plan for public service workers, utilizing various medical centers throughout the city. More than 2,600 members of the Chefs, Cooks, Pastry Cooks and Assistants Local 89 became the first subscribers to HIP in 1947. Through a merger with Group Health Incorporated, it became EmblemHealth in 2006.

He retired in 1947 when Lewisohn & Company was dissolved, but he continued to serve on various city boards such as the Board of Health. He served as the Chairman of the Commission on Health Services during the administration of New York City mayor Robert F. Wagner Jr.

== Philanthropy ==
Heyman founded the Heyman Center for the Humanities at Columbia University in 1981 with a contribution of $20 million.

== Personal life ==
Heyman died at his home on East 76th Street on January 7, 1984. He was survived by three sons, eleven grandchildren, and two great-grandchildren.
