= Sayu Bhojwani =

American civil servant (born 1967)

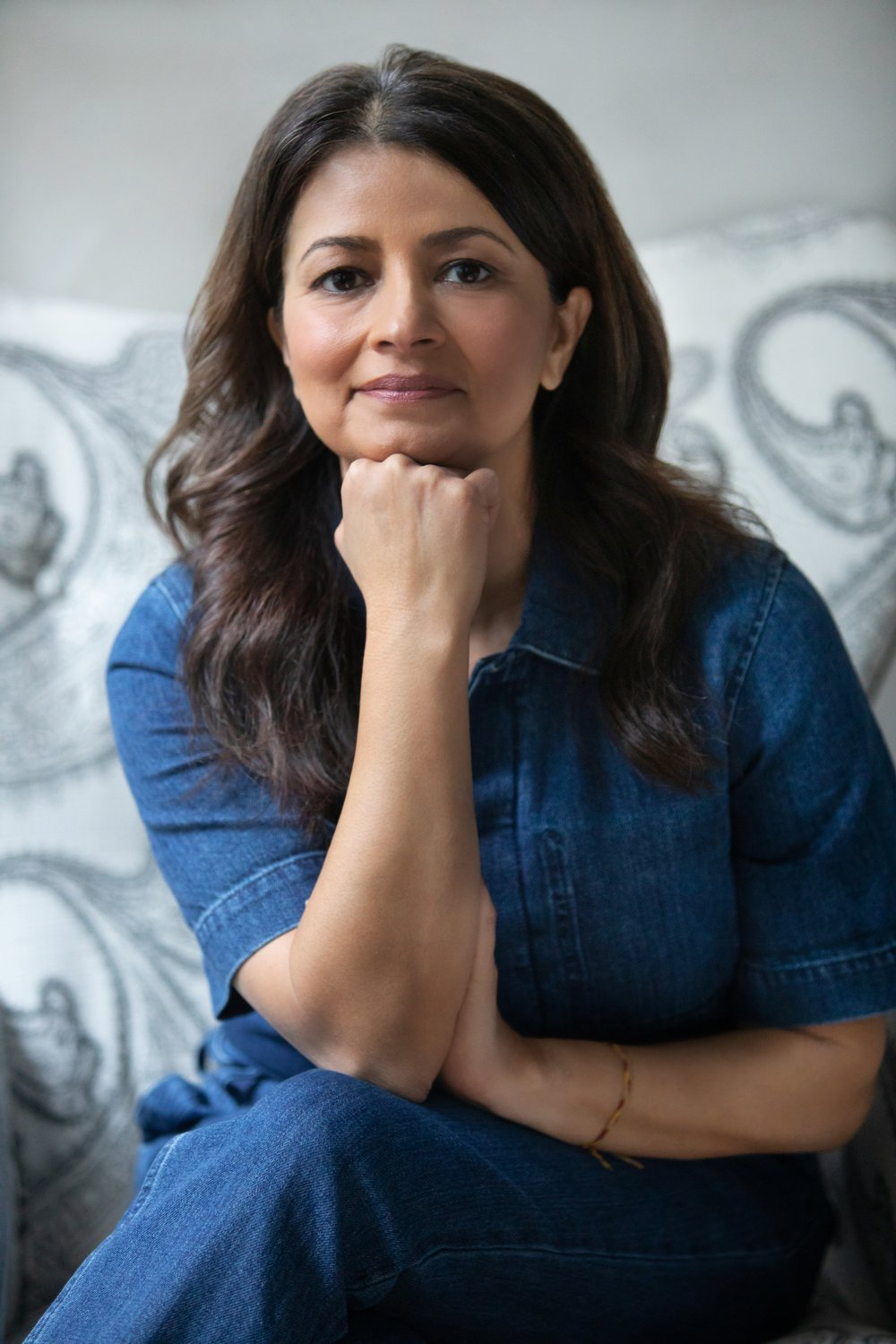
- Born: July 1967 (age 58–59); India
- Education: University of Miami (BA); Columbia University (MEd, PhD)
- Organization: New American Leaders
- Website: Official website

Sayu Bhojwani is an Indian-born American civic leader, author, and advocate for immigrant representation in government, she served as the first Commissioner of Immigrant Affairs of New York City. She also founded South Asian Youth Action, and the New American Leaders.

== Early life ==
Bhojwani is a first generation immigrant to the United States. She was born in 1967 in India to Sindhi parents. Her family immigrated to Belize, then the British Honduras, when she was four.

She moved to the United States to study English and Spanish at the University of Miami in 1980.

== Career ==
Bhojwani moved to New York City in 1987 as a student at Teachers College, Columbia University where she obtained her Master's degree in education with an emphasis on teaching English with the intention of returning to Belize to teach. She declined to pursue a career in education when the New York City Department of Education would not help her obtain a green card. She instead took a job with Asia Society, immersing herself in issues pertaining to Asian Americans and, as an NBC biographical article describes it, realizing that "there were very few faces on the policy-making side that looked like the people she was trying to serve."

As a resident of Queens, Bhojwani founded the afterschool South Asian Youth Action program in 1996 to support teenagers with ancestral origin from South Asia, which continues to serve New York today.

In 2001, Bhojwani re-enrolled at Teachers College for a doctorate in politics and education.

In April 2002, New York City Mayor Michael Bloomberg appointed her to the newly created role of Commissioner of Immigrant Affairs, where she expanded protections and services for the city's undocumented immigrants, domestic workers, and non-English speakers. She credits this role as demonstrating to her the power of a truly representative government, including having immigrants in positions of political influence to support immigrants. She served as Commissioner for two years, leaving the post in May 2004.

Bhojwani continued to work in philanthropy for Bloomberg, and moved to London for a time.

Bhojwani founded New American Leaders in 2010 after the United States Congress failed to create a path to citizenship for millions of undocumented immigrants and Arizona enacted Arizona SB 1070. She had considered running for office against Sheldon Silver, but decided to instead focus on building a diverse pipeline of local and state elected officials.

Bhojwani completed her doctorate at Teachers College in 2014, writing her thesis on immigrants and electoral politics.

== Personal life ==
She has one daughter, Yadna, with her husband Anshu.

== Published works ==
- Bhojwani, Sayu (2018). People Like Us: The New Wave of Candidates Knocking at Democracy's Door. The New Press. ISBN 978-1-62097-414-8
