= South Asian Youth Action =

South Asian Youth Action (SAYA!) is a 501(c)(3) non-profit youth development organization in New York City. Although focused on South Asian youth, the group is secular and works with young people of all ethnicities. The group aims to provide academic support to youth, assisting with preparation for higher education and exploring careers in fields such as sports, the arts and STEM fields. They also work to improve leadership skills and identity development.

== History ==
SAYA! was founded in New York City in 1996 by Sayu Bhojwani, who believed there was a significant lack in resources available to underprivileged youths. The group started as a small organization based in the basement of a church in Elmhurst, Queens, and grew in size to support a wider group in New York City.

In 1998 the group began a school-based counseling program, aiming to help the social workers employed in these schools to become advocates for the South Asian students within the academic system.

Two years later, after the 2000 United States census revealed a significant rise in the South Asian population in the United States, SAYA! expanded their programming to include Queens and Brooklyn.

The group expanded again following the September 11 attacks. In the aftermath of the terrorist attacks, South Asians in America faced a dramatic increase in racial and religious discrimination. Many South Asian students refused to go to school or other public spaces because of the rampant harassment. In December 2001, the Rockefeller Foundation awarded SAYA! with a grant which allowed them to expand their programs and influence. SAYA! worked to help youths discuss their own 9/11 stories and voice their opinions on the matter.

== Programs ==
=== Leadership and identity development ===
SAYA! offers programs for high school students that focus on identity development, health, and mentorship. By taking part in different conversations and activities, the group works to develop students' life skills to help them with challenges faced while growing up in the United States.

The group held its first annual Young Women's Leadership Conference during Asian Pacific American Heritage Month in May 2017. The conference's themes included cultural exploration, expression and empowerment. Led by their members, SAYA! offered activities and workshops aimed at guiding the participants in "exploring the intersecting cultural identities with which they identify, expressing pride in their cultures in the face of difficult political times, and empowering them to define their own communities and be voices of positive social change."

=== Academic support and career exploration ===
For the younger students in elementary and middle schools, SAYA! offers assistance with schoolwork and projects, emphasizing academic skills and offering support to the students' families. High school students receive mentoring, tutoring, and guidance on college application and preparation. SAYA! also has free SAT preparation classes and offers students trips to visit various universities.

=== Sports, arts and STEM ===
SAYA! encourages members to participate in outlets of creative expression, and emphasizes the importance of physical and mental health by urging students to participate in sports and practice yoga and meditation. Students are also encouraged to get involved in STEM activities such as architecture, coding, and robotics.

The Funny Girls leadership program for young girls emphasizes improvisational acting. It was created in 2017 by the Harnisch Foundation with SAYA! as one of the partners. The program is designed to help young girls be self-aware and resilient, with the ability to collaborate with others.
