= The Jaffa Institute =

- Founded: 1982
- Founder: David Portowicz, Col. Ze'ev (Zonik) Shaham (z"l)
- Type: NGO
- Purpose: Education, Vocational training, Food security, Local Coexistence, At-Risk Youth
- Location: Tel Aviv, Israel
- Region served: Tel Aviv-Yafo, Bat Yam, Holon, Bet Shemesh, Yehud,
- Method: Educational tutoring supplemented by therapy and nutritious meals, Empowerment workshops and vocational trainings for parents, Coexsitense programs and community development in mixed Arab and Jewish schools, At-risk youth hostels.
- Employees: 200
- Volunteers: 5500
- Website: www.jaffainstitute.org

The Institute for the Advancement of Education in Jaffa (“The Jaffa Institute”) is a non-profit, multi-service social agency located in Jaffa, Tel Aviv, Israel. The Institute was founded by Dr. David Portowicz and Col. Ze'ev (Zonik) Shaham z"l in 1982. In 2001, the Institute was awarded the President’s Prize for Most Outstanding Voluntary Organization.

The Jaffa Institute works closely with officials from Israel’s Ministry of Welfare and Social Services to target, provide assistance, and assess the progress of those in need within their service areas.

Through over 40 different program initiatives, the organization serves thousands of people annually.

== Purpose ==
The Jaffa Institute’s mission “is to provide educational, recreational, and social enrichment programs that breaks the cycle of intergenerational poverty in the greater-Jaffa community and support each child's self-esteem so that he/she can evolve into a healthy, educated, and productive adult.”

The Jaffa Institute employs what it describes as “a holistic approach, with activities all developed to empower and support the community as a whole.”

== Service areas ==
The Jaffa Institute operates in Jaffa, south Tel Aviv, Holon and Bat Yam. The residents of these areas come from diverse religious, ethnic and national backgrounds and include foreign workers, asylum seekers from Africa, and new immigrants from Ethiopia, Eastern Europe and East Asia, in addition to Israeli Jews and Arab citizens of Israel.

50% of the Jaffa Institute's target population currently lives at or below the poverty line and 30% of them regularly receive local welfare services. In addition, both the unemployment rate and the rate of single mothers in Jaffa are double that of Israel's overall census.

In November 2010, a "Report on Poverty" was released by the National Insurance Institute in Israel revealing that in 2009, 1.7 million Israelis were living below the poverty line; including 837,300 children. A resultant 40% of children in Israel are now considered to be living below the poverty line.

== Programs ==
=== Summer Camp ===
Every year from July through mid-August, The Jaffa Institute opens its doors to hundreds of vulnerable children and teens for its annual six-week summer day camp.

Camp Provides:

A Safe Haven: Stability, structure, and vital emotional support.
Essential Nutrition: Hot, healthy daily meals.
Academic Support: Dedicated learning to help children recover the school days lost during the 40-day war with Iran.
Pure Joy: Amusement and water parks, pools, cinemas, safaris, hikes and more.

== History ==
As a PhD student at Brandeis University in Boston, David Portowicz decided to focus his social work thesis on poverty in Jaffa. In 1982 Dr. Portowicz founded the Jaffa Institute.

The Jaffa Institute has expanded greatly in the last three decades. Today it provides services to thousands of individuals, encompassing both at-risk children and their families.

Originally focusing on education, the Jaffa Institute has now expanded its programming to include services such as after-school programming, crisis intervention, housing for neglected and abused children, workplace training programs for unemployed local women, educational and residential facilities for the rehabilitation and empowerment of teenagers at risk, hot meal programs, and a food distribution center.

== Awards ==
In 2001, the Institute was awarded the President’s Prize for Most Outstanding Voluntary Organization.

The Jaffa Institute’s Educational programming has twice received the Ministry of Education's Award for Outstanding Educational Program, once in 1995 and again in 2004.
