= Cheryl Eisen =

American home stager, interior designer and serial entrepreneur

- Born: Cheryl Eisen; October 17, 1968 (age 57)
- Occupations: President at Interior Marketing Group, Inc.
- Known for: Home Staging, Interior Design, Celebrities, Model home design

Cheryl Eisen is a New York City-based luxury home stager, celebrity interior designer, entrepreneur and founder of Interior Marketing Group, Inc. The New York Times, The Wall Street Journal, The New York Post, The New York Observer, Good Housekeeping, Forbes, Architectural Digest, Elle Decor and other notable media outlets have featured Eisen in association with her role in staging and designing New York City celebrity homes and luxury real estate.

== Early career ==
Cheryl Eisen’s career began when she launched her first company, an executive search firm called “FindNetwork” at age 24. Shortly after, due to the dotcom bubble burst, Eisen was forced to rebuild her career from scratch. She began working as a real estate agent, staging her own listings. Eisen soon discovered a crucial niche in an underserved market and decided to launch her own luxury staging and interior design company.

She founded Interior Marketing Group, Inc. in 2007; a 90% women-run interior design and staging firm that reinvents luxury properties to help them sell faster and at higher prices. She now serves as President of IMG, and works closely with the team to produce unmatched results.

Eisen, recognized for her uniquely effective design style, is frequently cited as an authority on New York City real estate and staging. In 2012, The New York Times featured her in a cover story titled "Ruthless Came the Stager," discussing how Eisen transformed a West 17th Street Apartment in New York City in less than two weeks.

== Home stager and interior designer ==
Eisen’s entrance as an authority in real estate and design media began with a 2009 article by LoftLife magazine, in which discussed Eisen's role in staging a model apartment in the LEED luxury building in the country, the Visionaire.

In 2011, The New York Observer noted that actor Peter Weller hired Eisen to stage his penthouse for sale.

In two separate articles, The Wall Street Journal highlighted Eisen as an authority on staging and the facilitation of real estate sales of financially challenging properties in New York City. The property industry magazine Multihousing News also covered Eisen in an article on staging as a strategy for selling luxury apartments.

She has appeared multiple times on the CBS program Living Large. The show featured Eisen's staging methods involving the sale of properties associated with celebrities.(YT1) In 2012, Season 1 of Bravo's Million Dollar Listing New York highlighted her work on one of Fredrik Eklund’s listings, which sold for $250,000 more than initial ask. Eisen was also featured in Season 2. Eisen and Interior Marketing Group's work continues to be featured across local, national and international media outlets including NBC's Open House NYC, The Real Housewives of New York City and Keeping Up with the Kardashians.

One article called Eisen "the reigning prop princess of luxury New York real estate.

In 2015, Eisen was tapped by PopSugar to star in Lionsgate and Rogue Atlas produced online show, Upstaged, a look at some of NYC's most expensive addresses, dramatic home transformations, and information on how to make it all happen affordably.

In 2017, a New York Business Journal article profiling Eisen's entrepreneurial journey reported that Interior Marketing Group has become a "multi-million-dollar, business" and one of "the largest home staging and interior design firms in Manhattan." The same year, Eisen and IMG were honored with Interior Design Magazine's "Best of Year Winner for Model Apartment" for their work on a SoHo apartment at 25 Mercer Street.

In 2018, a Business Insider article gave readers an inside look into a typical day of Eisen, as IMG’s CEO. In the article, "A day in the life of a luxury interior designer, who starts her day with a 'caffeine cocktail,' has designed homes for Chrissy Teigen and John Legend, and goes to a SoulCycle class every night," Eisen reveals the ins and outs of a typical day in her personal and professional life.

A 2018 Forbes article featured Eisen for her role in creating a “workplace that works for women,” and challenges the statistic that fewer than two percent of female owned businesses ever break the one million dollar mark (as reported by Forbes).

Inc. Magazine featured Eisen in a video on advice given to business owners titled,"The Brilliant Advice This Self-Made Millionaire Got at 18 (That Has Stuck With Her Ever Since)" in which Eisen calls and thanks her father.

Eisen is also known for her personal and professional relationship with Real Housewives of New York star, Bethenny Frankel. Eisen has assisted Bethenny in designing both her New York City apartment and Hamptons’ home, as seen in numerous press features.

In 2019 Elle Decor article, featured Eisen for her work as a Celebrity Home Stager, including her work with Keith Richards, Robert DeNiro, Mariska Hargitay.

An exclusive interview with Eisen for Elite Daily in September 2019 also shared an inside look at 'What It Takes To Stage Homes For Celebs,' from Eisen's experience working with A-list clients, buyers, and sellers in the luxury staging and design business.

The same year, Eisen was also named a "Top 50 Interior Designers To Know In 2019" by LuxDeco. Eisen was also featured as a celebrity guest on the Business of Home Podcast, which aired on February 17, 2020, discussing her career and "the stager's formula."

In 2020, Eisen also appeared in two Forbes articles, sharing her input on Home Decor Trends to Expect in 2020, as well as, design ideas to maximize space and functionality in your home.

Apartment Therapy, New York Magazine's The Strategist, Forbes and the New York Post consistently share Eisen as a tastemaker who knows the way to pull in buyers. In New York, Eisen and team have been connected to an $80M sale at 220 Central Park South, a street also known as Billionaire’s Row.

In 2022, Eisen and the IMG team staged a $25 million Upper West Side apartment owned by actress Kerry Washington using the team's signature style.

Press appearances in 2024 include a Realtor.com profile on Cheryl's celebrity work as well as a showcase of her expertise in Mansion Global in an article titled Decluttering Tips for the New Year. She was also quoted in The Spruce where she tells readers how to design for penthouses.

IMG's work was also featured in an April 2024 Wall Street Journal article titled "Los Angeles Has Notched Its Biggest Home Sale of the Year". A September 2024 article from the National Association of Realtors linked Eisen and IMG to a Jeff Bezos apartment they staged.

== Interior Marketing Group ==
Eisen is a founder and president of Interior Marketing Group, Inc. and her work has been associated to this company in a variety of publications. Interior Marketing Group (IMG) is a luxury real estate design and marketing firm headquartered in New York City that stages New York City luxury properties, worth $3 million or more, to increase their market desirability. IMG offers luxury home staging services as well as professional interior design, turn key furniture rentals, and in-house PR. The company was founded in 2007 by real estate agent turned designer, Cheryl Eisen, and focuses on high-end properties in New York City, the Hamptons, and South Florida. In April 2020, IMG launched an Outlet Sale featuring gently used furnishings and art from their inventory

== Awards ==
Cheryl Eisen has been recognized for her professional achievements by the 2018 Stevie Awards, as Female Entrepreneur of the Year (Silver Award) and Women-Run Workplace of the Year (Bronze Award).

The Real Estate Staging Association named Cheryl Eisen as one of the “Most Influential People In Real Estate Staging” and Love Happens Magazine coined Eisen as one of the “Top 26 Interior Designers in NYC” and amongst the 20 Top Interior Designers & Architects Creating Designer Home Decor” alongside her inspiration, Kelly Hoppen.

== Filmography ==
- 2012 CBS Living Large (4 Episodes)
- 2012 Bravo TV's Million Dollar Listing New York
- 2012 The Wall Street Journal Live
- 2013 NBC's Open House NYC (1 Episode)
- 2013 Bravo TV's Million Dollar Listing New York
- 2013 CBS Living Large
- 2014 NBC's Open House NYC (3 Episodes)
- 2014 CBS Living Large (1 Episode)
- 2015 Pop Sugar
- 2015 NBC's Open House NYC (2 Episodes)
- 2016 NBC's Open House NYC (3 Episodes)
- 2016 Business Insider VIDEO
- 2017 CBS New York Sunday Morning
- 2017 NBC's Open House NYC (2 Episodes)
- 2018 NBC's Open House NYC (2 Episodes)
- 2018 Bethenny and Fredrik, Season 1 (1 Episode)
- 2018 FOX 5 Real Estate with Rosanna (1 Episode)
- 2019 CBS Living Large (2 Episodes)
- 2019 NBC Open House (1 Episodes)
- 2019 Business Insider Video
- 2019 Insider (2 Episodes)
- 2020 CBS Living Large (1 Episode)
- 2022 NBC Open House (2 Episodes)
- 2023 NBC Open House (3 Episodes)
- 2024 NBC Open House NYC (3 Episodes)
