= Robert I. Lipp =

American businessman

Robert I. Lipp is a senior advisor of Stone Point Capital and the executive chairman of StoneRiver Group, L.P., a Trident IV portfolio company.

== Education ==
Lipp attended (and received an honorary degree from) Williams College. He graduated from Williams in 1960. He received his M.B.A. at Harvard University and his J.D. at New York University.

== Career ==
Prior to joining Stone Point, Lipp was a senior partner at Brysam Global Partners, a private equity firm, and had been senior advisor and director at JP Morgan Chase, where he focused on international consumer banking and senior-level executive management development. He is the former chairman and chief executive of Citigroup Global Consumer Group, and a former vice chairman of Citigroup.

Following his tenure at Citigroup, Lipp led the spin-off from Citigroup and the initial public offering (IPO) of Travelers Property Casualty Corporation in 2002, which at the time was the largest insurance industry IPO in U.S. history. He was chairman and CEO of Travelers Property Casualty Corporation until its merger in 2004 with St. Paul Companies, Inc. and became executive chairman of the combined board at that time.

Prior to joining Citigroup, Lipp spent 23 years with Chemical Bank, where he rose to the position of president and director.

== Personal life ==
Lipp is married to Martha Berman and together they have five children and twelve grandchildren. Successful and notable children include Anne Rose Berman who is married to the CEO of Travelers Insurance, Alan Schnitzer.

Lipp was chair of the board of trustees of Williams College. Lipp is president of the board of directors of the New York City Ballet and on the board of trustees at Carnegie Hall.
