= EmblemHealth =

American health insurance company

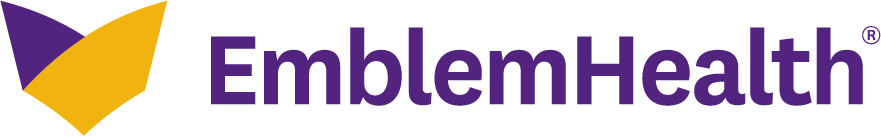
- Trade name: EmblemHealth
- Type: 501(c)(3)Nonprofit
- Industry: Health Insurance
- Founded: 1937
- Key people: Mike Palmateer (President and CEO)
- Products: Healthcare services Health insurance
- Website: www.emblemhealth.com

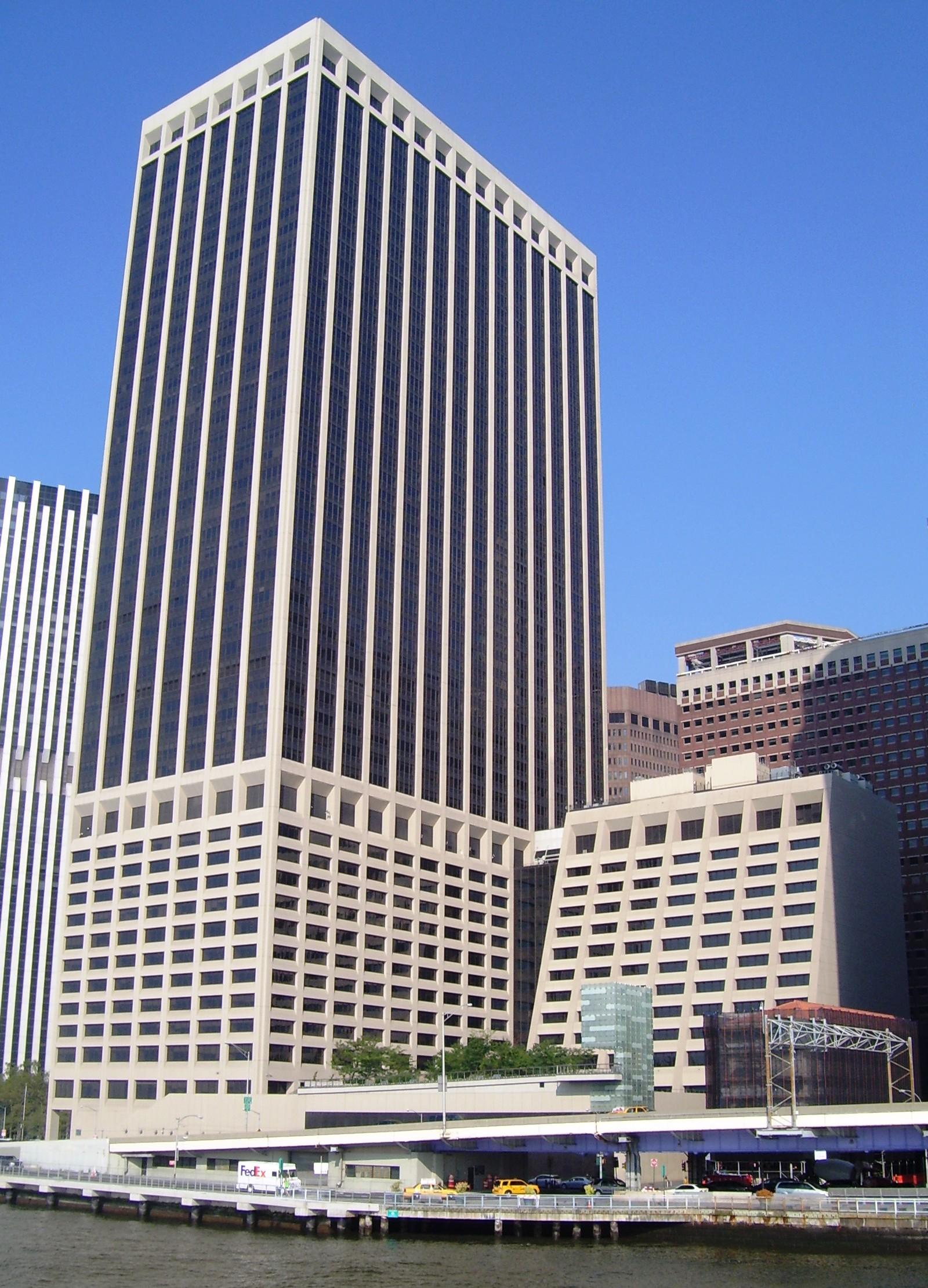
55 Water Street houses the company headquarters

EmblemHealth Inc is one of the United States' largest nonprofit health plans. Headquartered at 55 Water Street in Lower Manhattan, New York City, it is a multi-billion-dollar organization with over 3 million members.

EmblemHealth was created in 2006 through the merger of Group Health Incorporated (GHI) and the Health Insurance Plan of Greater New York (HIP). GHI and HIP had been operating as separate companies in the New York region since 1937 and 1947, respectively.

== History ==
=== Group Health Incorporated (GHI) ===
GHI – originally named Group Health Association of New York – was established in 1937 to provide New York's working families access to medical services. This new health care model was built around a network of participating providers and was a precursor to today's preferred provider organization (PPO).

HIP owned LaGuardia Hospital from 1964 thru 1996. GHI owned Hillcrest General Hospital during a similar period.

In order to expand its presence in the upstate New York market, GHI established GHI HMO as an incorporated entity in May 1999. The following month, GHI HMO acquired certain assets of Well Care Management Group, Inc.

In August 2005, GHI Select HMO acquired the assets, including the membership, of ABC Health Plans, which provides managed care services to Medicaid, Family Health Plus and Child Health Plus enrollees in Manhattan and the Bronx, New York City.

=== Health Insurance Plan of Greater New York (HIP) ===
Health Insurance Plan of Greater New York (HIP) was incorporated in 1944 as the first health insurance plan for public service workers. The company was founded by David M. Heyman with the support of New York City mayor Fiorello La Guardia, who wanted to offer medical services to New Yorkers of “moderate means.” HIP got its first members in 1947.

In 1997, HIP began offering its members medical services through a physician provider network, in addition to its medical centers.

In 2001, HIP acquired Vytra Health Plans Long Island along with certain related entities. Due to their steadily worsening financial condition, the decision was made to merge these entities into HIP, effective March 29, 2006.

In March 2005, HIP acquired ConnectiCare Holding Company, Inc., a Connecticut corporation and its subsidiaries. ConnectiCare was established in 1981 and serves approximately 245,000 members in a service area that includes the entire State of Connecticut; Berkshire, Hampshire, Hampden, Franklin and parts of Worcester counties in Massachusetts; and Westchester, Rockland, Putnam and Orange Counties in New York. ConnectiCare's members had access to a provider network of approximately 19,900 health care providers prior to the merger.

=== Merger of GHI and HIP ===
On September 29, 2005, the boards of directors of GHI and HIP announced an agreement to merge the two companies. The resulting company, to be named EmblemHealth, would be governed by a Foundation made up of an equal number of directors from both companies.

Anthony Watson, then chairman and CEO of HIP, managed the 2006 merger, which created the largest health insurer based in New York State. Watson's compensation, $8.8 million in 2011, was often discussed. In contrast, Mark Wagar, president and CEO of Empire Blue Cross and Blue Shield (part of Anthem), the largest New York insurer, was paid $2.2 million.

In May 2013, Frank Branchini became chairman and chief executive officer, succeeding Watson, who retired.

=== As EmblemHealth ===
In November 2012, EmblemHealth began a program called Neighborhood Care to provide health services, including health screenings, exercise classes and referral assistance, to underserved communities. The first two Neighborhood Care facilities were located in Harlem and Cambria Heights, Queens. Two additional Neighborhood Care sites were established in Chinatown in December 2013 and in Crown Heights in April 2016.

In January 2013, EmblemHealth announced a partnership with AdvantageCare Physicians (ACPNY).

On May 21, 2015, it was announced that Karen Ignagni, CEO of America's Health Insurance Plans (AHIP), would leave the industry's lobbying group to become president and CEO of EmblemHealth, effective September 1, 2015. Ignagni, who spent more than 20 years with AHIP, replaced Frank Branchini.

In February 2016, EmblemHealth announced a new partnership with the City of New York and the Municipal Labor Committee to provide expanded access to health care. The partnership was also developed to support the city's goal of health care cost savings for city taxpayers.

On March 25, 2016, EmblemHealth announced a two-year partnership agreement with Northwell Health.

In March 2020, EmblemHealth was named the winner of two Stevie Awards at the 14th annual Stevie Awards for Sales & Customer Service.

=== Legal controversy ===
In 2026, EmblemHealth entered into a settlement with the New York Attorney General, agreeing to pay a $2.5 million fine for failing to fix a series of errors that made it harder for its customers to get mental health care.

== See also ==
- WellCare
- Managed health care
- Healthcare companies
