= Robert M. Hayes (lawyer) =

Robert M. Hayes (born 12 November 1952) is the president of Community Healthcare Network since 2015. Before working in healthcare, Hayes primarily worked in law at multiple firms throughout the United States from 1977 to 2001. During his law career, Hayes started the 1979 lawsuit Callahan v. Carey where he was ruled in favor of making New York homeless shelters available based on the New York Constitution.

Hayes extended his work with the homeless after creating the National Coalition for the Homeless in 1982. He was named a MacArthur Fellow in 1985. Upon moving to healthcare in 2001, he worked at Medicare Rights Center from 2001 to 2009 and Universal American from 2010 to 2014.

== Early life and education ==
On 12 November 1952, Hayes was born in Brooklyn, New York. For his post-secondary education, Hayes went to Georgetown University for a Bachelor of Arts and a Juris Doctor from the New York University School of Law throughout the 1970s.

== Career ==
In the early 1970s, Hayes began his career in journalism as an assistant editor for Passenger Transport and an investigative journalist for the Long Island Catholic Newspaper. After working as a legislative assistant in healthcare from 1975 to 1977, Hayes began practicing law with Sullivan & Cromwell in 1977. While working as a litigator for the law firm, Hayes conducted interviews with the homeless people of New York City and started the 1979 lawsuit Callahan v. Carey. In the case, the court ruled in favor of Hayes after he argued a 1938 amendment of the New York Constitution guaranteed the availability of homeless shelters.

Hayes left Sullivan & Comwell in 1982 to launch the National Coalition for the Homeless. He remained with the coalition until 1989 where he brought numerous lawsuits expanding the right to shelter to women and families, and winning multiple cases involving the rights of people with mental disabilities and children. He later resumed his law career with the Los Angeles, California firm O'Melveny & Myers. In 1992, he moved to Portland, Maine to work with the law firm Moon, Moss, Gill & Bachelder.

Hayes shifted from law to healthcare upon his move to Hartsdale, New York in 2002. At the Medicare Rights Center, he served as president in 2002. Hayes held his executive position until he resigned in 2009. Hayes extended his career in health as a member of the quality assurance department for Universal American between 2010 and 2015. In January 2015, Hayes became the president of Community Healthcare Network in New York.

== Awards and honors ==
In 1985, Hayes was named a MacArthur Fellow. He holds honorary degrees from ten universities and colleges including Haverford, Long Island University, the New School University, Fordham University, and Georgetown University.
