= Begging laws in New York =

The administration of laws and regulations relating to begging in the state of New York is largely performed by each of the 62 counties of the state. Many of the state of New York's largest cities have introduced laws in the last decade prohibiting 'aggressive begging' in some form. New York City Administrative Code §10-136, City of Buffalo Code §317, City of Rochester Code §44-4, and Albany Code §255-59 prohibit forms of 'aggressive begging' which can include, but is not limited to, conduct that is likely to cause a fear of bodily harm, physical contact, approaching or blocking motor vehicles, and being within a certain distance of banks and ATMs. Syracuse City General Ordinances §16-9 and §16-11 prohibit lewd solicitation and loitering. The city of Yonkers does not currently have any similar law. New York City also has bans on all begging within the subway system and in airports.

== History ==
This situation of banning specific aggressive elements of panhandling arose because of several challenges to previous begging laws on the grounds of constitutionality. In 1990, the ban on begging in New York City's subway was challenged in Young v. New York City Transit Authority, and the Second Circuit Court of Appeals found that the ban in this case did not infringe on First Amendment rights to free speech. However, this precedent did not last long as it was seemingly overturned in 1993, in Loper v. New York City Police Department. The Loper case was a challenge to the statewide law in the New York Penal Code §240.35(1) which made it an offence to loiter in a public place for the purpose of begging. The New York City Police Department rarely issued fines under this law, but used it to 'move on' beggars. In Loper, the Second Circuit Court of Appeals found begging in this case to be a First Amendment right. And clarified that the ban on the subway system in the Young case was a reasonable limit as, even though it was publicly owned, panhandling in the confined space of the subway system can disrupt and startle passengers and potentially cause harm. Whereas, the blanket ban in all public spaces in the Loper case would leave beggars nowhere else for begging, which was considered an 'expressive activity' and thus protected by the First Amendment.

A similar judgement was made in International Society for Krishna Consciousness, Inc. v. Lee in regard to New York City's airports, which found it reasonable to ban such activities in airports. This has led to the distinction between public places and public places that are not public forums. The airports and subways of New York, while being public places, are not public forums as the free exchange of ideas has never been considered its principal purpose, unlike the streets of New York.

The Loper judgement is narrow in that it only forbade a blanket ban of begging; in fact, it suggested city councils introduce more targeted begging laws, such as those for aggressive begging, and spoke favourably of the laws in Seattle, Washington. After the Loper case, which found §240.35(1) of the state's Penal Code to be unconstitutional, the New York City Police Department stopped enforcing that section of the code. However, the law still technically remained in force in the rest of New York state until it was repealed in 2010. This caused some people in New York state to be charged under that section of the law after Loper, but before it was repealed.

Civil liberties groups have campaigned against the more targeted, aggressive begging laws, however, they have been found to comply with the First Amendment. In 2006, the City of Rochester's current aggressive begging laws withstood a legal challenge in People v. Barton. And in 2010, New York City's current aggressive begging laws also withstood challenge in People v. Stroman.

== See also ==
- Homelessness in New York
