= New York City migrant housing crisis =

The New York City migrant housing crisis is a migrant crisis that began in April 2022, exacerbated by the existing New York City housing shortage. It has been driven by the Venezuelan refugee crisis, and to a lesser extent that from Haiti and other countries. New York City is a sanctuary city.

Texas Governor Greg Abbott's Operation Lone Star has seen the busing of migrants from the Mexico–United States border to sanctuary cities across the United States, initiated after the CDC announced rescinding of Title 42 expulsions on April 1, 2022. The Texas free busing does not constitute the majority of recent migrants, but it does account for many of the highest-need cases. The crisis has strained the city shelter system, and sparked controversy around temporary new shelters, as Mayor Eric Adams has sought to modify the 1981 consent decree for Callahan v. Carey. Temporary protected status for Venezuelans, facilitating work permits with a goal of reducing dependency, was extended by President Biden in September 2023, after strong lobbying by New York political leaders.

In July 2023, Mayor Eric Adams argued that New York City was running out of room and resources to provide for the influx of roughly 100,000 migrants from the southern border. He said, "Our cup has basically runneth over. We have no more room in the city."

In September 2023, Adams warned reporters that the migrant crisis could "destroy" New York City.

On December 27, 2023, Adams signed an executive order requiring bus operators to give 32 hours notice before dropping off migrants, requiring a passenger manifest, and limiting dropoffs to a site near Times Square between 8:30am and noon. This led to bus operators dropping migrants off at New Jersey train stations with tickets to New York City. As of August 2024, the city had received more than 210,000 migrants since the crisis began.

== See also ==
- Illegal immigration to New York City
- Martha's Vineyard migrant airlift
