= Monique Holsey-Hyman =

American academic and politician

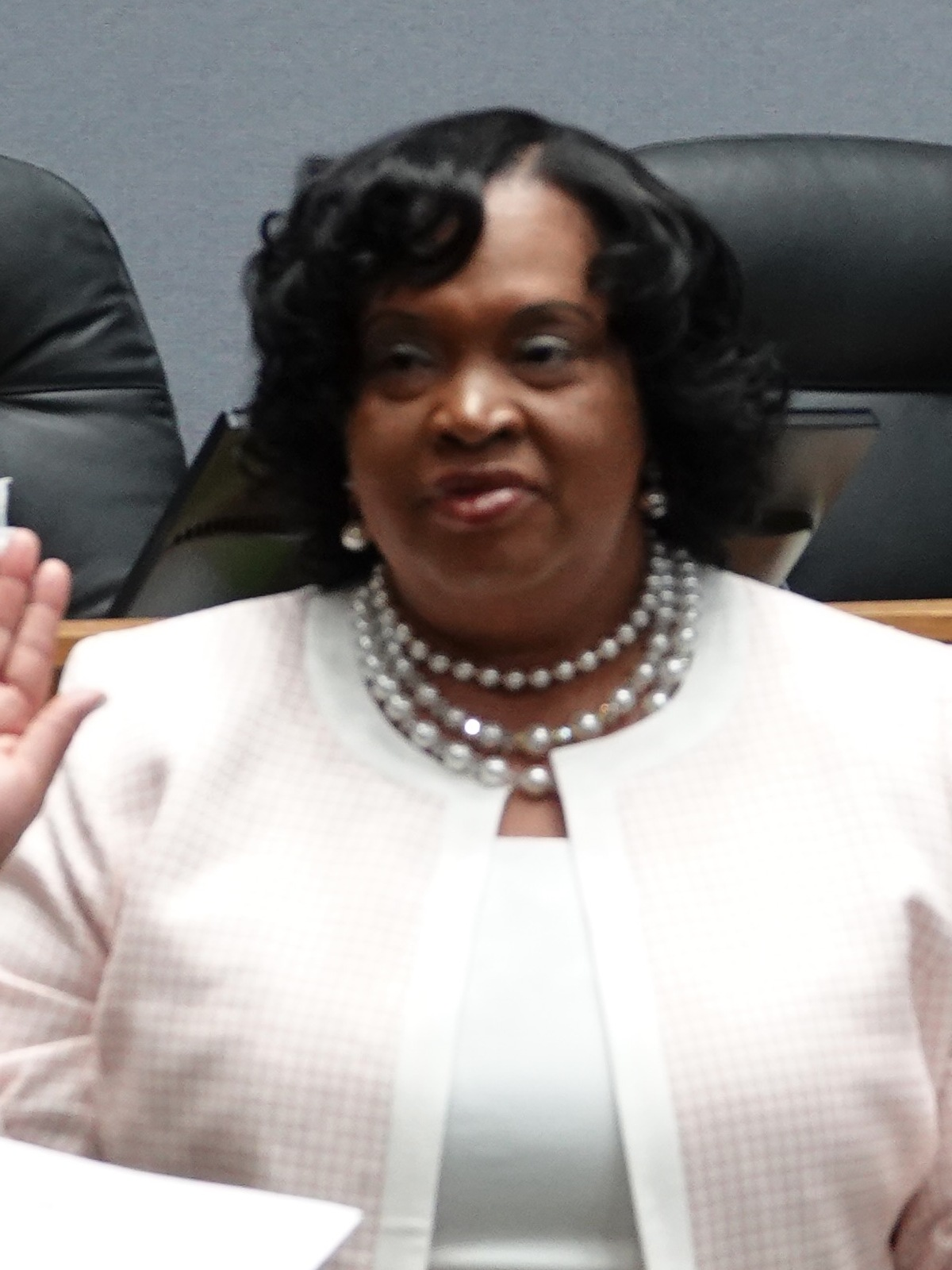
- Holsey-Hyman being sworn into office in 2022

At-large Member of the Durham City Council
- In office May 11, 2022 – December 4, 2023
- Preceded by: Charlie Reece
- Succeeded by: Nate Baker; Carl Rist

Personal details
- Born: November 10, 1965 (age 60) South Bronx, New York City, New York, U.S.
- Party: Democratic
- Spouse: Craig Hyman
- Children: 2
- Education: Binghamton University (BS); Columbia University (MSW); Walden University (EdD)
- Occupation: politician, social worker, professor

Monique Holsey-Hyman (born November 10, 1965) is an American social worker, professor, and politician. Prior to her work in politics and academia, Holsey-Hyman worked as a social worker in New York City. She was a caseworker for the New York City Human Resources Administration, served as Director of the Intensive Care Management Program at the Steinway Child and Family Services Center of Queens, served as the Bronx Director of Case Management, and was the Center Director for the Community Healthcare Network. Holsey-Hyman also served as a consultant for Saint Vincent's Catholic Medical Centers, Brooklyn Hospital Center, and the New York City Housing Authority.

Since 2018, she serves on the faculty at North Carolina Central University, as the assistant professor of social work, and formerly served on the faculty as an adjunct professor at Berkeley College and as the curriculum coordinator and special assistant to the Vice President of Academic Affairs for Retention and Recruitment at Shaw University. In 2022, Holsey-Hyman was appointed to the Durham City Council.

In March 2023, Holsey-Hyman was accused of extortion. The North Carolina State Bureau of Investigation investigated the claims and, in September 2023, closed the investigation due to a lack of cooperation from the original complainants.

== Early life and education ==
Holsey-Hyman was born and raised in the South Bronx in New York City. She is the daughter of Lee Belton Holsey and a granddaughter of Lee Holsey and Cornelius Carter Holsey.

She graduated from Adlai E. Stevenson High School in 1982. In 1986, she graduated with a Bachelor of Science degree in human services and sociology from Binghamton University. In 1992, she earned a Master of Social Work degree from the Columbia University School of Social Work. She obtained a Doctor of Education degree in administration and leadership from Walden University in 2015 and completed certification to administer psychotherapy in 2005. She is a member of Alpha Kappa Alpha.

== Career ==
=== Social work ===
In 1986, Holsey-Hyman became a caseworker for the New York City Human Resources Administration and the Child Welfare Administration. In 1995, she worked for the not-for-profit areana at Steinway Child and Family Services in Queens, New York. She later served as Steinway's director for the Intensive Care Management Program.

Holsey-Hyman became a certified social worker in New York in 1996 and was promoted to the role of Bronx Director of Case Management. In 2002, she became the Center Director for the Community Healthcare Network in Queens. She worked in direct clinical practice and administrative positions in social work for twenty-five years before working in academic instruction and accrediation in higher education.

She also worked as a consultant for Saint Vincent's Catholic Medical Centers, Brooklyn Hospital Center, and the New York City Housing Authority.

=== Academia ===
In 2005, Holsey-Hyman began working in higher education as an adjunct professor in the Liberal Arts Department at Berkeley College in New York. After teaching at Berkeley, Holsey-Hyman moved to North Carolina to work in academic administration at Shaw University, a historically black college in Raleigh. At Shaw, she served as curriculum coordinator, special assistant to the vice president of Academic Affairs for Retention and Recruitment, and worked to accredit and implement the university's Bachelor of Social Work program.

In 2016, Holsey-Hyman joined the faculty at North Carolina Central University, and became assistant professor in the Department of Social Work in 2018. She served on the university's Quality Education Plan Committee, the Faculty Senate, and multiple committees in the social work department. Holsey-Hyman also serves as the faculty co-advisor for Phi Alpha.

In 2017, she was awarded a Woman of the Year Honors by Spectacular Magazine for her work in education.

=== Politics ===
In 2022, Holsey-Hyman was selected to finish the Durham City Council term of Councilman Charlie Reece, who resigned to move to Paris. She was selected unanimously out of over twently candidates who applied to fill the vacant seat in the city council. She was sworn into office on May 11, 2022.

She was appointed by Mayor Elaine O'Neal to serve on the Affordable Housing Implementation Committee, the Citizens Advisory Committee, the Durham-Chapel Hill-Orange Work Group, the Council Legislative Committee, the Northeast Central Durham Subcommittee, the Recreation Advisory Commission, Sister Cities of Durham, and the Upper Neuse River Basin Association Board of Directors. She was also appointed by O'Neal to serve as an alternate on the Homeless Services Advisory Committee, the Human Relations Committee, the Joiny-City County Committee, and the Triangle J Council of Government's Center of the Region Enterprises committee.

Holsey-Hyman also serves as an appointed member of the community organization HBCUgrowBoard.

On February 6, 2023, Holsey-Hyman voted against annexing 111 acres of land in Southeast Durham for a housing development. Mayor Elaine O'Neal and Councilwoman DeDreana Freeman also voted against the annexation. The initiative passed, with four councilmembers voting in favor of the project, leading to twenty-four parcels of land being annexed in Southeast Durham for the construction of up to 545 townhouse units.

==== Extortion allegations and investigation ====
On March 23, 2023, Durham mayor Elaine O'Neal read a statement at a city council meeting from Durham Attorney Kimberly Rehberg that accused a Durham City councilperson of offering their vote in support of a real estate developer's project in exchange for election campaign donations. Rehberg stated that while she formally made the accusation on March 23, had notified the council of her concerns on March 13. O'Neal did not reveal the identity of the accused, but other councilmembers later confirmed that Holsey-Hyman was the accused person.

Allegations were also made against Holsey-Hyman accusing her of using the help of a city staffer for her election campaign work while the staffer was working on city time, therefore being paid by government funds. There were two separate incidents involving city staffers and campaign work, one in September 2022 and one in January 2023. The city council looked to censure her for these incidents. In response to the allegation for the September incident, Holsey-Hyman defended herself, saying that she was new to the council and wasn't aware of the rules about staffers. In response to the January incident, she said that she had been granted approval for the staffer to volunteer for her by the city's human resources department. In her defense speech, Holsey-Hyman stated, "I've come through a lot of storms. But never has my character been questioned." The city staffer was formally disciplined for engaging in campaign activity on Holsey-Hyman's behalf while on work duty and using city resources. Councilwoman DeDreana Freeman supported Holsey-Hyman against the staffer allegations, claiming that gender may be playing a role in how the city council is responding.

Councilwoman Jillian Johnson introduced a resolution to censure Holsey-Hyman for the staffer allegations, set to be voted on at the city council meeting on April 3. Johnson made a statement saying that the allegations "reflect on our entire council, our city, our commitments to our community, and the way we use our power and authority."

Mayor O'Neal reached out to the UNC School of Government for guidance on how the council should respond to allegations against a council member. She made a formal request with the North Carolina State Bureau of Investigation to open an inquiry into the allegations against Holsey-Hyman and issued a statement saying, "the consensus among the majority of city council members is that the allegations are very disturbing, must be taken very seriously and, if true, may constitute criminal activity and could lead to criminal consequences." If the accusations are true, Holsey-Hyman could face extortion charges.

On March 27, 2023, Durham County District Attorney Satana Deberry announced that the State Bureau was asked to investigate allegations made against a Durham City Council member.

At the Durham City Council meeting on April 3, 2023, where the council had planned to vote on censuring Holsey-Hyman, the voting did not take place.

In June 2023, Durham city attorney Kimberly Rehberg, at the requests of Holsey-Hyman, O'Neal, and Freeman, sent a certified letter to the Wikimedia Foundation requesting for the identities of three Wikipedia editors who had worked on the politicians' articles to be revealed, along with individual changes requested to be made to the aforementioned articles. Holsey-Hyman in particular contended the coverage in her article regarding the accusations of extortion against her, stating that the allegations were "fabricated". As a result, she sought to be given the identities of two of the previously mentioned Wikipedia editors- one, who created her article and wrote much of its content, and another, who "insisted on preserving a link to Durham City Councilwoman Jillian Johnson". The user who created Holsey-Hyman's page was also requested to have their identity revealed by Freeman, who stated that she felt "deep unease" over the fact that the user had created both Holsey-Hyman and Freeman's articles. The requests were denied.

In September 2023, the North Carolina State Bureau of Investigation concluded its investigation, finding that there was no evidence to support the extortion allegations against Holsey-Hyman.
