= New York City housing shortage =

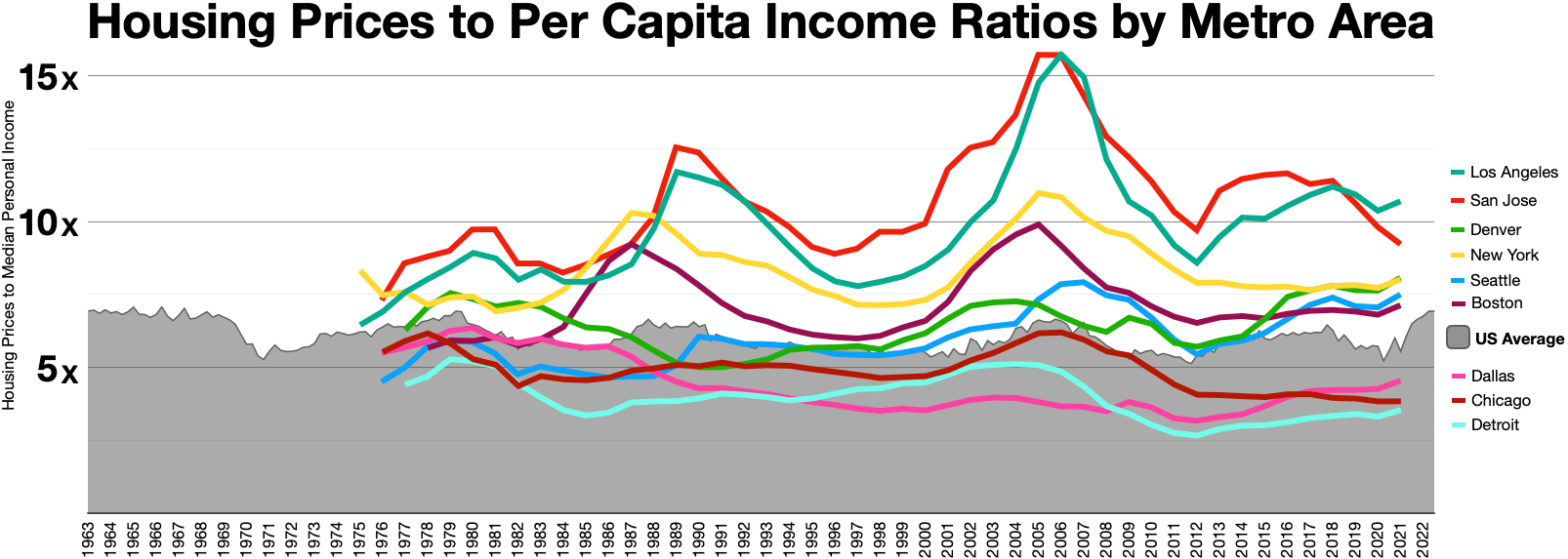
Housing prices to personal income ratios by metro area Los Angeles San Jose Denver New York Seattle Boston United States average Dallas Chicago Detroit

For many decades, the New York metropolitan area has suffered from an increasing shortage of housing, as housing supply has not met housing demand. As a result, New York City has the highest rents of any city in the United States.

The New York metropolitan area has long-standing exclusionary zoning practices, which were frequently rooted in racism. Restrictive zoning regulations, which prohibited multifamily residential use and affordable housing, were intended to prevent non-whites from moving to white neighborhoods.

The housing shortage in New York is driven by a lack of housing supply. Home construction in New York City lags far behind other major American cities. From 2010 to 2023, housing supply in the city increased by 4% while jobs increased by 22%. In the suburbs of New York City, restrictive zoning regulations are a key contributor to the undersupply of housing, as zoning laws either prohibit or disincentivize any but single-family detached homes in most parts of Nassau, Suffolk, Westchester, Putnam and other surrounding counties.

In the 2020s, some New York politicians pushed for ambitious plans to increase housing supply in New York by undoing some of the most restrictive zoning regulations to permit mixed-use development in areas previously exclusively for commercial use, allow accessory dwelling units in single-family zones, and allow dense housing construction near public transit stations. These plans faced considerable opposition by politicians from the New York suburbs, in particular, where zoning is most restrictive.

In August 2026, the New York City Department of City Planning and New York City Department of Housing Preservation and Development released a draft of their Fair Housing Growth Strategy report, which evaluates the city's housing need and how to solve it. The report estimated the city needs at least 700,000 new homes over the next decade to address the housing shortage.

== Supply factors ==
In the post-war era, New York, like most American cities, saw a sharp decline in population with suburbinization promoted by highway construction and greater use of old commuter railroads. With better transport, workers could commute longer distances and their families could decamp from cities to newly built suburbs outside the city limits. Consequently, from approximately 1950 to 2000, New York City's total population sat below its previous all-time high. This "white flight" or exodus from the city allowed rents to remain relatively affordable through the immediate post-war era.

However, in the late 20th century cultural changes increased demand for city life as individuals and families became increasingly likely to remain in cities, or at least delay moves to the suburbs. Jobs returned to downtown centers and demand for housing in New York boomed.

To absorb this demand, New York produced 2.2 units per job from 2001 to 2008. However, from 2009 to 2018 the City built just 0.5 units per job as land use regulation, historical preservation, and political opposition ground housing production to a halt.

Consequently, the cost of housing production has skyrocketed in New York. With little available land remaining for development, long approvals processes, and onerous building code provisions, production costs for housing have markedly increased at every step of the process. As a result, developers are unable to provide moderately-priced housing as the costs imposed by the City and local opposition forces have made housing for the middle class prohibitively expensive to build. Other regulations inhibit repartitioning existing units to accommodate more people. New York City housing codes prevent overcrowding by restricting the number of people who are legally allowed to occupy a unit, as well as the number of bedrooms within a unit.

Moreover, New York's public housing stock, a vital tool for reducing homelessness and maintaining the number of affordable units, has fallen into disrepair as government management failed the City's low-income residents.

== Zoning ==
With production costs and zoning laws limiting private production of housing, and incompetence and criminal mismanagement reducing the efficacy of public housing, New York is facing a chronic housing shortage that increases costs for all New Yorkers looking to rent or buy a new home. Groups like the Citizens Housing and Planning Council and Open New York advocate for a resolution of the housing shortage through zoning reforms that would increase the rate of housing production.

In 2016, Mayor Bill de Blasio promised an even more aggressive plan to build and preserve 200,000 housing units over ten-years and he introduced mandatory-inclusionary zoning requiring 30 percent of all new construction units to be affordable. The goals of the initiative, which was called Housing New York, were later increased to 300,000 affordable housing units by 2026. By the end of his administration, in 2021, none of the goals of the program had been reached: although De Blasio claimed that he had succeeded in "fighting inequality". De Blasio, however, has been accused of favoring for profit developers and development projects that either priced out or evicted local residents and was unaffordable for those that needed it the most in the areas where new developments were being built.

== Demand factors ==
Between 2000 and 2012, the median rent of an apartment increased 75 percent in New York City compared to 44 percent for the rest of the United States. The increase impacted the poor and working class most. There was a loss of 400,000 apartments renting for $1,000 a month or less (constant 2012 dollars) and a resulting gain of apartments renting over this. This was not a small shift but saw 240,000 units renting for $601–800 disappear and apartments renting for $1,201-1,600 having the highest gains. Median rent in constant dollars increased from $839 in 2000 to $1,100 in 2012.

Partially offsetting the growth in housing units was an increase in population to 8.6 million people. All boroughs, including the Bronx, are close to all-time population highs as of 2018. Factors include an increase in employment to 4.5 million jobs and a trend of decreasing crime.

As of 2025, housing prices in the NYC area are so high that most first-time home buyers, even if they are relatively well paid, can only afford to buy a home if their parents can give them large sums of money. The ability and willingness of some older parents to pay for their adult children's housing and other expenses drives up rent and purchase prices.

== Impact of affordable housing shortage ==
=== Overcrowding ===
Almost 1.5 million people live in overcrowded conditions in New York City. Overall crowding rose from 7.6 percent in 2005 to 8.8 percent in 2013 (a 15.8 percent increase). Overcrowding is not limited to low-income households, but is found at all income levels.

The California Health and Human Services Agency defines "severe overcrowding" as more than 1.5 persons per room. The severe overcrowding rate in the nation is 0.99 percent and is 3.33 percent in New York City.

=== Homelessness ===
Housing affordability in New York City varies by neighborhood but it is a challenge to many. Low-income and working-class areas, especially in the Bronx, Northern Manhattan, and parts of Brooklyn and Queens, face massive pressure from rising rents and a limited housing supply. Even most neighborhoods traditionally considered more affordable struggle to provide more stable housing. One of the main causes of homelessness is the lack of affordable and accessible housing. The Coalition for the homeless claim that the city's primary causes of homelessness are excessive rents and a lack of affordable housing. In 2018 there were 63,495 homeless in New York City, including over 23,600 children. Total homelessness in the city had increased by 82 percent over the last decade. According to an agency funded by the New York State Education Department, there were 104,088 students (1 in 10) living in temporary shelters and identified as homeless in the city's school system for the period 2016-2017. A recent article talks about this, according to a 2025 report by the New York State Comptroller, homelessness in New York State more than quadrupled between 2022 and 2024, with the majority of the increase that occurs in New York City.

Homelessness is expensive for the city. Following a 1981 consent decree arising from Callahan v. Carey, the city is required by law to provide shelter to any eligible person who asks for it. To shelter one family in one of the family shelters costs $34,573 a year. $1.04 billion was budgeted for 2014 to provide homeless services, up from $535.8 million in 2002. Rent control, subsidized development, and public housing initiatives that started in the 1930s are example of a government response. Despite all of the efforts, the development of affordable housing is still limited by structural issues including high building prices and a lack of available land.

== Government initiatives ==
The city has had many periods of housing shortages in its history. Following a housing crisis in the 1920s, 700,000 units were built but in the 1930s people were again talking about a crisis. Mayors Fiorello H. La Guardia and William O'Dwyer promoted slum clearance and the New York City Housing Authority. Rent control in New York, having begun as part of price controls on the United States home front during World War II, continued after the war. Robert F. Wagner Jr. and John Lindsay oversaw the Mitchell-Lama Housing Program. Ed Koch was mayor during a wave of housing abandonment which had to be addressed. This continued under David Dinkins and Rudy Giuliani.

Homelessness of individuals and families became a major issue during the 1980s and 1990s. Mayor Bloomberg's term in office saw an economically resurgent city. During this period, rents in New York City rose more than 15 percent over the increase in the country as a whole. His New Housing Marketplace Plan pledged to create 165,000 units of affordable housing between 2002-2014, of which 53,000 would be new units and 112,000 preserved units. The cost for this program was $23.6 billion, of which $5.3 billion was public funds leveraging $18.3 billion in private funds.

=== Ballot Measures ===
In 2025, the New York City Charter Revision Commission approved three housing ballot proposals to appear in the 2025 election.

- Question 1: Fast Track Affordable Housing to Build More Affordable Housing Across the City would allow the Board of Standards and Appeals (BSA) to grant zoning relief for publicly financed affordable housing projects; as well as expedite the public review procedure for applications that deliver affordable housing in the 12 community districts that have permitted the lowest rate of affordable housing production.
- Question 2: Simplify Review of Modest Housing and Infrastructure Projects would create an Expedited Land Use Review Procedure for certain land use changes and projects related to affordable housing, including how much housing is allowed, acquisition and disposition of land to facilitate affordable housing, and climate resiliency projects.
- Question 3: Establish an Affordable Housing Appeals Board with Council, Borough, and Citywide Representation would create a new Affordable Housing Appeals Board consisting of the Borough President, Speaker of the City Council, and Mayor, which would have the power to review and reverse decisions by the city council that disapprove and modify land-use applications that directly facilitate the creation of affordable housing, replacing the mayor's veto power.

Each of these ballot measures passed by similar margins. Question 1 passed with 58.52%, Question 2 passed with 56.94%, and Question 3 passed with 58.45% of the vote.

In 2026, the NYC Commission on Government Efficiency released a ballot proposal, Proposition 4: Changes to Building Permitting Charter Amendment, which would simplify building permitting by merging 40 approvals and 18 separate offices and agencies into one place by creating a centralized hub for construction permits and approvals. It would also centralize waterfront permitting from the Department of Small Business Services to the Department of Buildings.

== See also ==
- 421-a tax exemption, which promotes affordable housing in New York City by giving tax breaks to real-estate developers for building new multi-family residential housing buildings
- OneNYC, the official strategic plan for development of NYC
- San Francisco housing shortage
- California housing shortage
- Gentrification in New York City
- Rent regulation in New York
- New York City migrant housing crisis
