= Homelessness in New York =

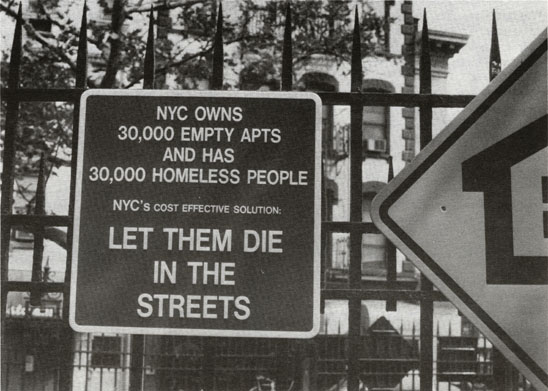
1990 protest sign by Gran Fury, an art collective of AIDS activists.

With the migrant housing crisis of recent years, homelessness in New York City has reached some of its highest levels since the Great Depression of the 1930s. As of July 2024, over 132,000 individuals slept in NYC homeless shelters, not accounting for the thousands sleeping in unsheltered public spaces. Over 200,000 members of the population were estimated to be temporarily doubled up in the homes of others, so the total estimate reaches nearly 350,000 homeless people, according to the Coalition for the Homeless. Government policy in this area is shaped by the legacy of the 1979 decision Callahan v. Carey, which established a right to shelter (unusual compared to national policy), the interpretation of which has however been greatly contested over the years. The chief municipal agency has since 1993 been the New York City Department of Homeless Services. The situation is also exacerbated by the wider decades-long New York City housing shortage.

The number of homeless individuals residing in NYC's shelter system skyrocketed in 2024, rising 53% when compared to the statistics in 2023, despite efforts from Mayor Eric Adams.

== Demographics ==
The Coalition for the Homeless, a New York-based non-profit organization, reports that 30% of single adults entering the shelter system each year enter directly from institutional settings. In 2018 6,100 adults entered from institutional settings, including: 3,466 from prison, 1,294 from non-hospital facilities (i.e. nursing homes), 760 from psychiatric hospitals, and 580 discharged from Rikers Island.

In 2019, 59% of single adults in shelters were Black, 27% were Hispanic, 10% were white (non-Hispanic), 4% unknown/other, and 0.4% Asian/Pacific Islander. Black people are disproportionately homeless, making up 29% of NYC residents (35% difference). Whites are underrepresented, making up 32% of NYC residents (22% difference). The NYC Asian homeless population is marginally higher than the statistic shown above, and found in Chinatown based shelters or are on the streets.

As of 2024, additional demographic data was released, revealing that 71% of those in homeless shelters were part of families, which included 45,852 children. 45% were new arrivals, consisting of 65,731 individuals, suggesting a significant increase in the homeless problem.

According to the Bowery Mission, "In most cases, multiple factors are involved [in homelessness]. Common ones include: mental illness, substance abuse, untreated medical issues, traumatic events, violence and abuse, lack of affordable housing and difficulty sustaining employment."

== History ==
=== Late 20th century ===
Throughout the years homeless shelters have changed dramatically since the city was compelled to give the homeless the right to a shelter. Homelessness became increasingly visibile in New York City around the early to mid 1970s. This was due to gentrification, property abandonment and reduced government development. Early shelter options started as single-room occupancy (SROs). During this time homelessness was not seen as a crisis until the homeless population started growing more and becoming more and more visible. In 1979, a New York City lawyer, Robert Hayes, brought a class action suit before the courts, Callahan v. Carey, against the City and State, arguing for a person's state constitutional "right to shelter". The City and State agreed to provide board and shelter to all homeless men who met the need standard for welfare or who were homeless by certain other standards. Homelessness was brought to national attention as the New York City Police (NYPD) were seen conducting major street sweeps near Madison Square Garden for the 1980 Democratic National Convention (DNC).

Callahan v. Carey was settled as a consent decree in August 1981, a turning point, and in that year Hayes and other founded the Coalition of the Homeless. A year later this would be extended to women (Eldredge v. Koch) as well. In 1983 it would extend to those with mental health issues. In 1986, McCain v. Koch would extend this right to families as a whole.

=== 2000s ===
In 2004, New York's Department of Homeless Services (DHS) created HomeBase, a network of neighborhood-based services, to help tenants in housing crisis to remain in their communities and avoid entering shelter. Tenants can visit HomeBase locations within their neighborhoods to receive services to prevent eviction, assistance obtaining public benefits, emergency rental assistance and more. Brooklyn nonprofit CAMBA, Inc operates several HomeBase locations as well as an outfitted "You Can Van," which uses data on pending evictions to travel throughout the borough and offer help.

=== 2010s ===
According to the Coalition for the Homeless, the homeless population of New York rose to an all-time high in 2011. A reported 113,552 people slept in the city's emergency shelters in 2010, including over 40,000 children; marking an 8 percent increase from the previous year, and a 37 percent increase from 2002. There was also a rise in the number of families relying on shelters, approximately 29,000. That is an increase of 80% from 2002. About half of the people who slept in shelter in 2010 returned for housing in 2011.

According to DHS, 64 percent of those applying for emergency shelter in 2010 were denied. Several were denied because they were said to have family who could house them when in actuality this might not have been the case. Applicants may have faced overcrowding, unsafe conditions, or may have had relatives unwilling to house them. According to Mary Brosnaham, spokeswoman for Coalition for the Homeless, the administration of Mayor Michael Bloomberg employs a deliberate policy of "active deterrence".

The New York City Housing Authority is experiencing record demand for subsidized housing assistance. However, just 13,000 of the 29,000 families who applied were admitted into the public housing system or received federal housing vouchers known as Section 8 in 2010. Due to budget cuts there have been no new applicants accepted to receive Section 8.

In March 2010, there were protests about the Governor's proposed cut of $65 million in annual funding to the homeless adult services system. The Bloomberg administration announced an immediate halt to the Advantage program, threatening to cast 15,000 families back into the shelters or onto the streets. A court has delayed the cut until May 2011 because there was doubt over the legality of cancelling the city's commitment. However, the Advantage program itself was consciously advanced by the Bloomberg administration as an alternative to providing long-term affordable housing opportunities for the poor and working class.

The result, as the Coalition for the Homeless report points out, is that "Thousands of formerly-homeless children and families have been forced back into homelessness. In addition, Mayor Bloomberg proposed $37 million in cuts to the city's budget for homeless services this year."

In March 2013, the New York City Department of Homeless Services reported that the sheltered homeless population consisted of:

- 27,844 adults
- 20,627 children
- 48,471 total individuals

Homeless encampments have long featured prominently in the landscape of American cities. A 2015 Sergeants Benevolent Association anti-homeless campaign called 'Peek-A-Boo, We See You Too' sparked an uproar about the presence of homeless people more generally. Urban financialization in particular has focused on the city's stock of low-income rent stabilized housing. The warehousing of vacant buildings by speculators led to an increase in homeless encampments.

In 2018, DHS's budget was $2.15 billion. It fluctuated over the next few years, with 2021's proposed budget being slightly lower at $2.13 billion.

=== 2020s ===
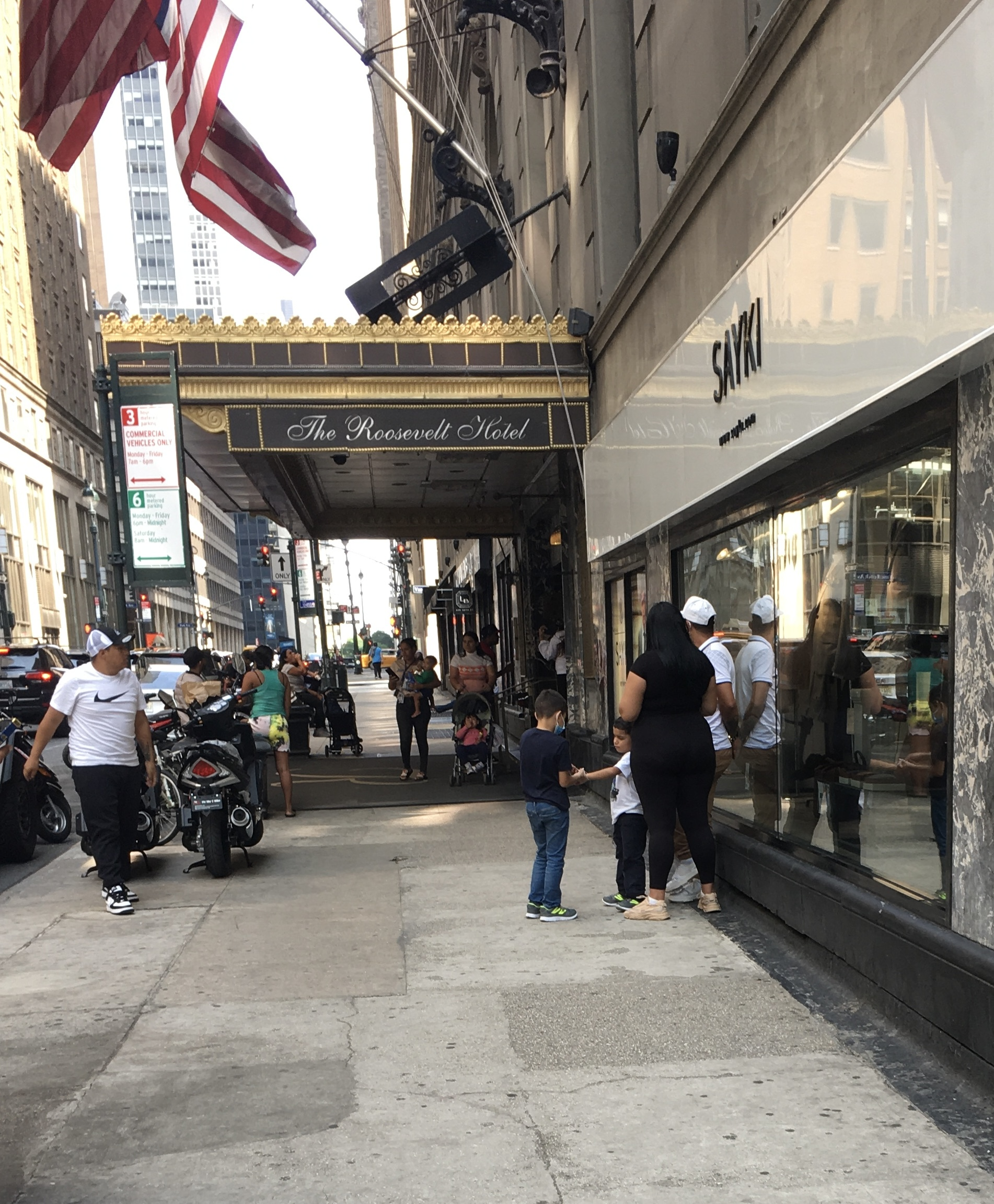
Roosevelt Hotel with migrant asylum seekers outside June 2023

The local COVID-19 pandemic was one contributing factor to growing homelessness; it also includes rising rent, lack of housing and asylum seekers. In 2022 the city experienced a migrant housing crisis, and the population of New York's homeless shelters increased as more asylum seekers arrived.

During early 2023 to early 2025, New York City has seen a gigantic surge in asylum seekers entering the city. These included refugees from the Ukraine war, fleeing Venezuelans and immigrants from the Mexico. Because of this surge, former New York Mayor Eric Adams decided to open emergency shelter hotels to incoming asylum seekers to alleviate pressure on other shelters around the city. This would only increase the strain on shelters already operating at or near capacity. Most of the New York state funding that was spent on these hotels could have gone to other shelters but were sent these hotels as they were a priority.

The total homeless population in New York State more than doubled between January 2022 to 2024. According to a 2025 report released by New York State Comptroller Thomas P. DiNapoli, homelessness grew by 53.1% from January 2023 to January 2024, more than four times the rest of the nation. The number of children increased in almost 30,000 in 2 years. New York has had a housing affordability crisis for a while, but after quarantine, the numbers sharply accelerated within those 2 years, faster than the rest of the nation. Homeless impacts all states and all people.

People experiencing homelessness in New York in 2024 were disproportionately Hispanic or Black. The share of Hispanic or Latino homeless grew from 33.7 percent in 2021 to 55.5 percent in 2024. Ten percent suffered from severe mental illness or chronic substance abuse. According to the Office of the State Comptroller, between the spring of 2022 and December 8, 2024, New York City reported more than 225,700 asylum seekers had come through its intake system. New York City was housing approximately 68,000 asylum seekers in total in January 2024, the month in which asylum seekers in City shelters peaked. New York City's strategy for dealing with this influx also entailed relocating some migrant families to areas outside the city, including neighboring counties but also other urban areas in the state, potentially influencing homelessness in these areas, as well.

A voucher program to supplement CityFHEPS was agreed in June 2026, after a 2023 initiative fell thorough amid disagreement between Mayor Adams and the City Council.

In 2026, to tackle the systemic shortage of affordable housing in New York City, the mayoral administration of Zohran Mamdani introduced a municipal housing plan titled "Block by Block". Under the plan, the city aims to construct 200,000 new, rent-stabilized homes and stabilize an additional 200,000 units over the next decade. Supported by a $22 billion capital investment over five years, the push is designed to increase the number of homes available for homeless New Yorkers by nearly 45 percent.

The city's policy also ties building upkeep directly to worker pay. Through a program called "Fix the City," New York funds emergency repairs and strips neglected buildings away from irresponsible landlords. These buildings are then tracked for takeovers by local non-profits, community land trusts, or the tenants themselves. This expansion is regulated by the Construction Justice Act, which raises the minimum wage and benefit floor to $40 an hour for laborers working on city-funded affordable housing developments.

== Experiences of different populations ==
=== Women ===
==== Hygiene and lack of resources ====
Women in the New York City shelter systems face many challenges regarding health and hygiene. Some challenges they may face include the lack of safe and clean spaces to manage menstruation as well as the shame and stigma against menstruation. Women in these situations have a limited access to toilets, water, menstrual products and lack important information surrounding how menstruation works. The inability to maintain proper hygiene and lack of educational materials about menstruation. This can lead to urinary tract infections, yeast infections, vulvar contact dermatitis and other issues.

==== Domestic violence survivors ====
Gender based violence is a major contribution to homelessness. Many women in shelter systems have left their home due to abusive living situations. Women leave their homes in search of an emergency shelter for themselves or for their children's safety. Around 20 to 30 percent of women in these circumstances are ineligible to apply to emergency shelters due to not being public assistance recipients. Women that do get accepted at these emergency shelters have 48 to 93 days to find permanent housing. Many women who do not have much time to find permanent housing fear going back to their abuser due to having no other choice. Limited resources and lack of affordable housing has made it difficult to find help. Many individuals that have asked for help have been told by the city that there was no space available at these emergency shelters.

The Violence Against Women Act (VAWA) has worked to help women that are facing violence in their homes. This law is applicable in eighteen states such as New York while other states have not passed laws to help these victims. Women that call the police can face nuisance ordinances. Nuisance ordinances are laws that require landlords to evict tenants that call the police frequently. These laws are placed to ensure the safety of the neighborhood and to reduce the amount of crime if too frequent. Many women stay with their abusers as they might be evicted for calling the police for domestic violence related situations or may not receive help with the limited housing options in their area. Congress found that there is a strong link between domestic violence and homelessness. Changes in the VAWA 2022 Reauthorization help those facing violence as well as those around them. The first law provides protection to landlords and others that report the crime. The second law protects domestic violence survivors that live or applies to a covered housing program.

In recent years, there has been an increase of domestic violence in New York with many arrests of abusers because of the multiple studies done since COVID-19. With the passing of the VAWA act, women that are experiencing violence can submit a request to transfer apartments to stay away from their abuser. In New York, the New York City Housing Authority (NYCHA) evaluate these requests and approve eligible requests when a unit is available. NYCHA approves requests quickly for those in unlivable situations while 2,000 survivors were waitlisted to be transferred. Many individuals that are waitlisted might await help for years depending on how long it takes for an available unit to open up. Individuals that wait years might stay with their abuser as they may not have stability or wait to be transferred from a homeless shelter. NYCHA has placed emergency transfers at the lowest priority while other non emergency transfers are ranked as top priority which leads to an even longer wait of two to three years for an emergency transfer.

Coalition for the Homeless is a non-profit formed in 1981 that works to help improve the issue of homelessness in New York as well as domestic violence survivors. Coalition for the Homeless provides crisis hotlines, housing, job training, counseling and crisis intervention for homeless individuals and those facing domestic violence. The non profit also provides help to survivors and have programs for mothers with children.

=== LGBTQ+ community ===
LGBTQ+ youth account for 40% of the homeless youth population but only make up 7% of the youth population, this is ranging from the ages of 13-24. Contributing factors for LGBTQ youth vulnerability are family rejection, religious intolerance and systemic discrimination. One of the most prevalent reasons cited is family rejection, with approximately 80% of LGBTQ+ homeless youth stating they were either kicked out or ran away from their homes due to being rejected because of their sexual orientation or gender identity/expression. A study conducted between youths who have experienced family rejection and those have not showed how rejected youths were more likely to suffer from depression and attempt suicide.

Many of these youths who seek shelter end up living in hostile environments, forcing them to leave. Some LGBTQ+ youth feel safer living on the streets and sleeping in subways than to live in homeless shelters. This is due to LGBTQ+ individuals often being faced with prejudice from other individuals in these shelters, leading to many of them being targeted. Some individuals have reported their experiences in shelters to be ordeal, reporting being robbed, beaten, harassed, extorted and discriminated. In one reported case, an individual stated being extorted and threatened for money when living in a homeless shelter by another woman, claiming she would not allow him to use the bathroom unless he gave her $40. With shelter conditions being hostile many have no choice but to end up living back on the streets where they are met with unsafe living conditions. Survival sex is a common thing some youth in the streets engage in to get by. This is the exchange of sex for resources like shelter, food, or money.

=== Senior citizens ===
For seniors living in New York City there are barriers regarding housing affordability, safety concerns and shelter systems. From 2014 to 2022, the number of individuals 65 or older living in shelter systems has more than doubled. Many seniors do not have the support or resources necessary for them to meet their needs. One of the problems they face is the lack of permanent housing. About 315,00 older New Yorkers are on waiting lists for subsidized apartments, which is reserved for people 62 years or older. The wait time on this list can vary but in most cases the average wait time is six years, if not more.

The intake process for people applying to shelters and subsidized housing is described as "grueling" by some individuals. This process can take anywhere from 6-12 hours, often requiring for these elderly individuals to have to spend their nights in plastic chairs as they wait. some individuals are unable to fill out these forms due to brain injuries, learning disabilities or other impairments, with individuals claiming the DHS does not adequately accommodate these needs.

According to interviews with shelter residents, many seniors living in shelters describe the environment to be "rough" and "dangerous". One individual, a 74-year old resident living in a Mixed-age shelter reported being punched in the face after a dispute over the television volume. some of these shelters have deteriorating infrastructure, with chronic elevator breakdowns, water leaks and lack of accessible mobility. Another individual, a 63-year old was barred from the shelter for bringing his oxygen tank, claiming he violated their rule as his oxygen tank was considered flammable. Because he needed his tank in order to breathe he was forced to live on the streets.

=== Youth homelessness & risk factors ===
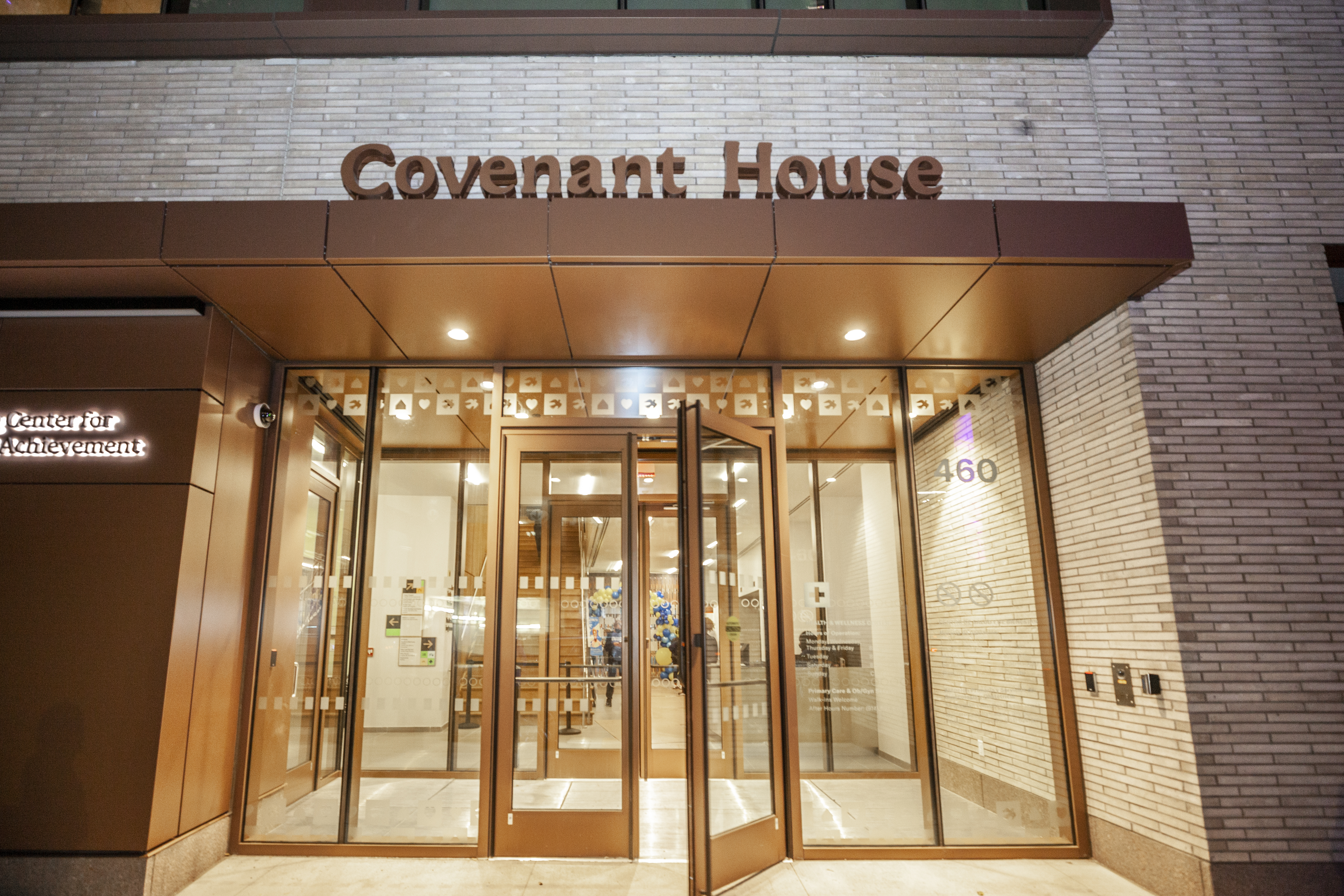
Covenant House New York provides crisis housing and transitional support services for youth experiencing homelessness.

Numerous studies of New York City since the 2010s show correlations between chronic youth homelessness and the lack of adequate support systems; this shortage is often exacerbated by administrative burdens and siloed government support networks. Youth frequently face challenges accessing preventive services, including mental health care, substance abuse treatment, and parenting resources, all of which have been historically underfunded. This lack of support strains institutional transitions, particularly for youth who "age out" of the foster care system between the ages of 18 and 21; a shift that results in the termination of state services and housing assistance.

==== Correlations between foster care and substance use ====
A 2011 study examined whether a history of foster care correlated with substance use risks among 424 newly homeless young adults aged 18 to 21, and other risk factors. The final sample of shelter residents was 57% Black, 26% Hispanic, 7% White (non-Hispanic), and 10% unknown or other ethnicities. Of the population, 64% were male, 36% were female, and 35% of all surveyed admissions had a history in the foster care system.

Participants in the study were surveyed about their use of various substances, among them: alcohol, marijuana, and cigarettes were the most frequently used. Among these substances, cigarettes ranked first, coming in at 40%, while alcohol and marijuana rates were identical, sitting at 21% each; additionally, 11% of the surveyed population had previously received substance abuse treatment.

After adjusting for demographic risk factors, the study results demonstrated that homeless young adults with histories of foster care were three times as likely to smoke cigarettes, more than three times as likely to use marijuana, and almost nine times as likely to have been in drug treatment than their peers without a foster care history.

==== Transitional vulnerabilities post-discharge ====
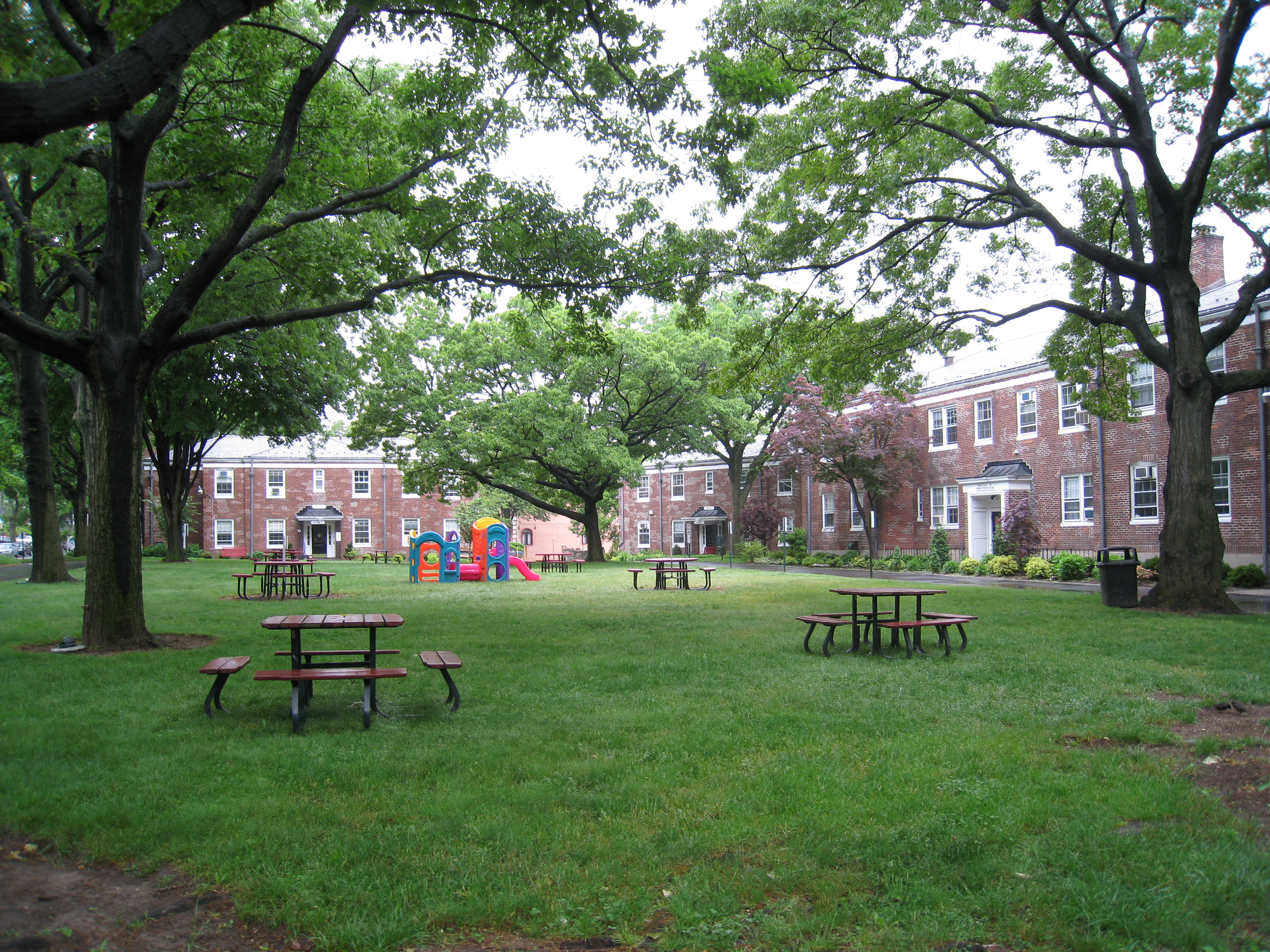
Forestdale, a foster care agency in Queens, New York, provides transitional support and family services for youth in the child welfare system.

New York City is the largest and most densely populated metropolitan area in the United States, with over 8.5 million residents. Within this massive urban population, the high demand for housing creates competition for affordable living spaces, impacting vulnerable populations. Roughly 500 young adults exit foster care every year in New York City without being adopted or reunified with their birth families. Data indicates a stark gap between the foster system's goals and the city's housing market. While the system aims to transition youth into adulthood, New York's competitive housing market creates a policy gap that leaves over one-fifth of these foster youth to experience homelessness within six years of leaving care.

The underfunding of preventive services significantly increases the vulnerability of youth transitioning out of the child welfare system. When these foster youth are provided with inadequate institutional support, the risk of housing instability is highest immediately following discharge. Tracked data indicate that 8% of youth experience homelessness within the first six months; two-thirds of this first-time homelessness occurs during this initial half-year window. Studies show that youths' experiences are strong indicators of whether they will face housing instability later in life. For example, youth who run away from foster placements multiple times while in care are eight times more likely to experience homelessness; those transitioning directly from institutional support settings like group homes face more than quadruple the rates. Interpersonal support serves as a significant factor in the success of transitioning youth, as studies show that maintaining a close relationship with at least one adult family member reduces a youth's odds of post-discharge homelessness by 68%.

== Programs and government responses ==
Homelessness rates and the decrease in shelter exits continues to result in overcrowding and overspending. In fiscal year 2025, the budget of the New York City Department of Homeless Services (DHS) at 3.96 billion remains inadequate and complicated, with shelters at or beyond capacity.

=== New York / New York Agreements ===
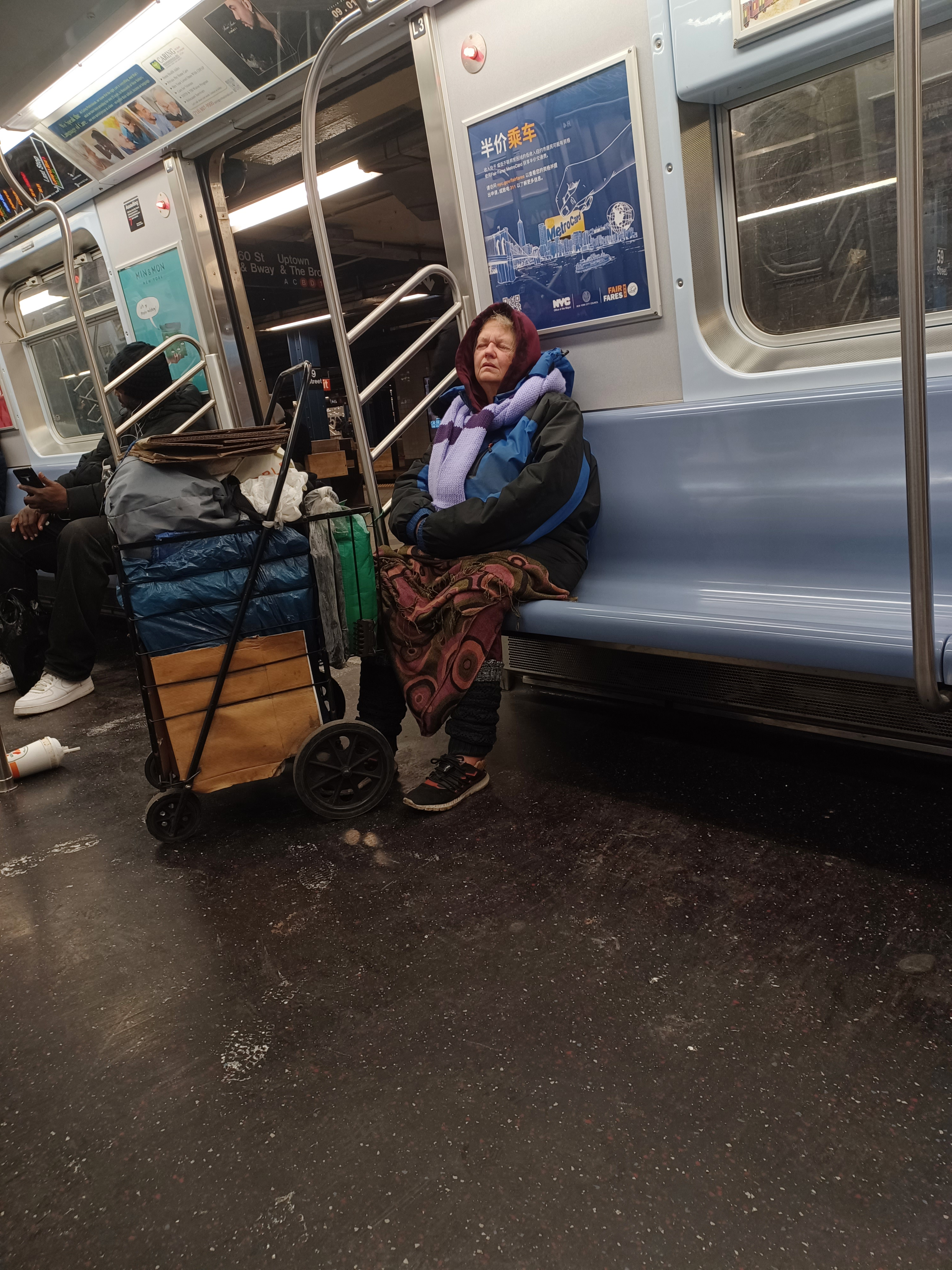
Homeless Subway Rider 2022

The New York / New York agreements are a set of joint city-state partnerships primarily focused on housing individuals with serious mental illness. On August 22, 1990, Governor Mario Cuomo and Mayor David Dinkins signed the first of the NY/NY Agreements, which pledged to build 3,314 units of supportive housing, with the funding being equally paid for by the city and the state. The initiative housed 5,225 homeless persons with serious mental illness and added 500 additional units by 1993. Eligibility for this first phase required applicants to have a diagnosed serious mental illness and meet specific homelessness criteria, such as four months of continuous use of the municipal shelter system or documentation of living in public areas like parks or subways.

The partnership was followed up by NY/NY II in 1999, bringing the creation of 2,320 supportive housing units over a span of 5 years, with a continued focus on mentally ill homeless individuals. NY/NY III was signed by Mayor Michael Bloomberg and Governor George Pataki in November 2005. The third of a set of the city-state agreements committed to creating 9,000 units of permanent supportive housing for chronically homeless single adults with complex behavioral and medical needs. 6,250 of these units were one centralized housing project with treatment services available on site, with the remaining 2,750 being scattered.

NY/NY III broadened the scope of eligibility to nine distinct categories, including chronically homeless single adults with serious mental illness or substance abuse disorders, young adults aging out of foster care (ages 18–25), and families in which the head of household suffers from a disabling medical condition or HIV/AIDS. Another key feature of NY/NY III was the Chronic Homelessness Priority Designation, which prioritized individuals who had been homeless for at least 365 days over the last two years or for two of the last four years. To obtain eligibility for these units, applicants must submit detailed documentation of their housing history and clinical disorders through the HRA 2010e supportive housing application.

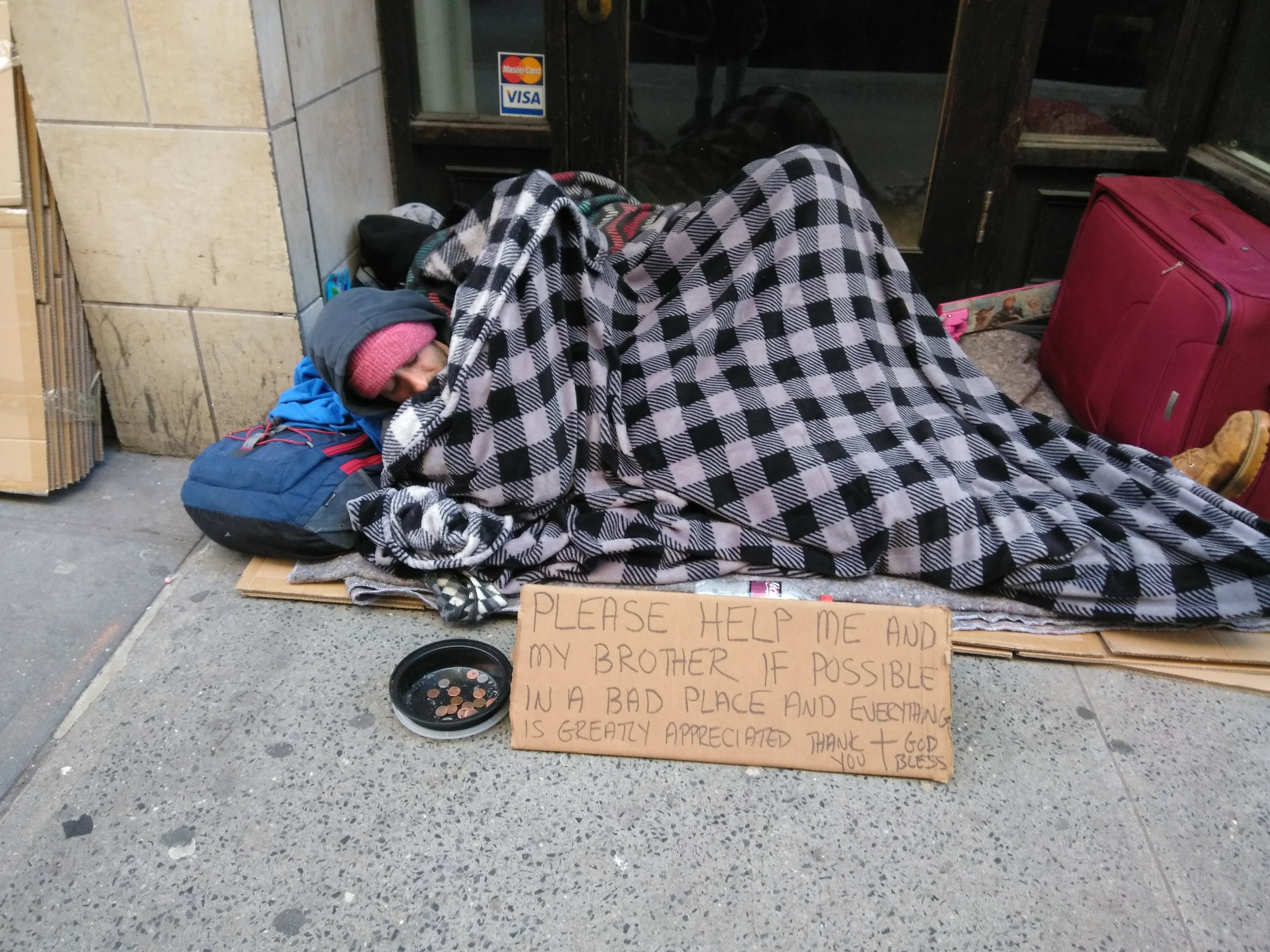
A homeless man lying on the ground with a sign in front of him.

=== HOME-STAT ===
In 2015, Bill de Blasio introduced HOME-STAT (Homeless Outreach & Mobile Engagement Street Action Teams). HOME-STAT is a city-wide case management system which compiles information on unsheltered homelessness from 311 calls and street canvassing teams. Outreach teams include staff from different agencies including the Department of Homeless Services, the NYPD, and other social service agencies.

The core tenets of HOME-STAT are: proactive canvassing from Canal Street to 145th Street to identify "hotspots of persistent homelessness presence," immediate response to 311 calls by expanding the number of city street outreach staff and NYPD officers assigned to the Homeless Outreach Unit, and the creation of a city-wide case management system that facilitates "continuous monitoring and outreach" and "rapid response to individual problems." Under HOME-STAT, the city has created a by-name list of individuals known to outreach teams, confirmed to be experiencing homelessness, and currently engaged by outreach teams.

The city encourages New Yorkers to call 311 when they see individuals, they believe to be homeless, and call 911 if the individual seems to be a risk to themselves or others. This relies on individual New Yorkers to assume someone to be homeless and creates a division between New Yorkers with reliable shelter and without, encouraging people to use the city as an intermediary. The city labels homeless individuals who avoid the city's shelters as "service resistant". It has been reported 70% of homeless refuse shelter and help when assist programs approach them in this way. Social work researchers from NYU conducted a study in 2017 that challenged these perceived refusals, bringing up issues like concerns about safety or inability to bring household pets.

In 2019, Coalition for the Homeless reported that the city's shelters struggle with 3 main issues including: "large-scale capital needs, routine cleaning and maintenance, and dehumanizing treatment by shelter staff." Coalition for the Homeless explains that these conditions create an unsafe, degrading and dehumanizing environment for those who stay in shelters.

=== Housing and Urban Development-Veterans Affairs Supportive Housing ===
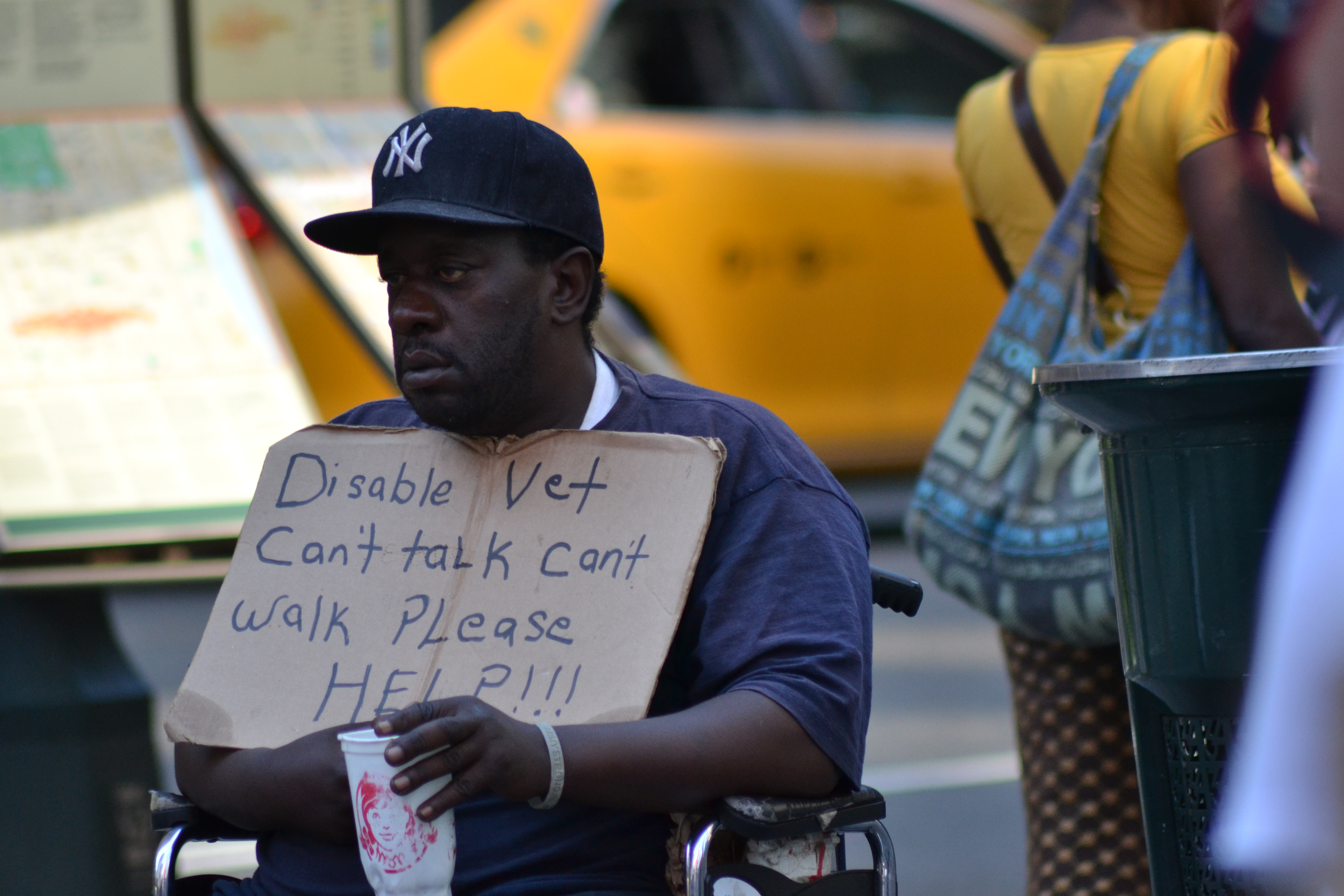
Homeless veteran outside Madison Square garden NYC

The Housing and Urban Development-Veterans Affairs Supportive Housing OR HUD-VASH is a collaborative program between the U.S. Department of Veterans Affairs and the Department of Housing and Urban Development designed to provide homeless veterans with rental assistance through Housing Choice Vouchers, along with VA clinical and case management services. Established in 1992, the program has helped over 200,000 chronically homeless veterans achieve housing stability. The program saw significant expansion in 2015, when Congress created a Tribal HUD-VASH pilot to expand delivery on tribal lands, with an initial funding of $1 million USD in 2016, growing over $10 million by 2024. In 2025 HUD announced an additional $2.2 million to further support Native American Veterans. Since 2008, the program has permanently housed 91,500 veterans and their family members and awarded more than 116,000 vouchers through a network of over 750 Public Housing Authorities.

=== City Fighting Homelessness and Eviction Prevention Supplement ===
The City Fighting Homelessness and Eviction Prevention Supplement or CityFHEPS was designed to assist low-income families and individuals find stable housing or preventing them from losing housing if they already have it, dividing the benefit into two categories: To Stay and To Move. This recurring government subsidy pays either a large portion or the entire number of qualifying tenants' rent directly to their landlord, allowing for the tenant to only pay what they can afford in accordance with their income. The voucher covers security deposits, broker fees, utility bills paid separately from rent, and moving cost. The program will not cover additional fees such as parking, gym, or pet fees that are listed on the lease but are not standard rent. Eligibility is determined by several factors not limited to condition and income at or below 200% of the federal poverty level. Payment is based solely on the number of people in household to keep in line with the New York City Human Resources Administration policy that mandates one bedroom or sleeping area per two adult household members be subsidized.

Tenants in the To Stay category are given a Household Share Letter detailing the amount of rent they are responsible for each month. If a tenant uses CITY FHEPS to backpay rent to a landlord, it is then classified as a loan, and the amount must be paid back. The rent is not considered late as long as Department of Social Services sends a check within the calendar month of the due date. Those in the To Move category are given a Shopping Letter that can be shown to landlords and brokers as proof of a housing voucher.

In 2025, the consecutive 90-day shelter requirement was removed, and as of 2023 the vouchers can be used statewide to account for the difficulty of securing an apartment in the city, however lower payment standards may apply. Other changes made on September 13, 2025, now require that households enrolled in the program five or more years with earned income to contribute 40% of their monthly income toward the rent, a ten percent increase from the standard 30%. The increase has drawn criticism from housing advocates, arguing that it places formerly homeless at risk of losing housing.

An audit done by New York State Comptroller Thomas P. DiNapoli found that lack of oversight and administrative mishaps are contributing to rising cost and putting families in unsafe housing. The audit evaluated 75 CityFHEPS cases from a pool of approximately 8,000 from January 2022 to May 2024. In several cases, DSS failed to conduct the required pre-clearance inspections before tenants moved in, placing vulnerable families in apartments in unites with mold, pest infestation and missing window guards; one family being placed into a unit right after the previous tenant vacated for safety reasons.

=== Housing Opportunities for Persons with AIDS ===
In 1990, the Housing Opportunities for Persons with AIDS (HOPWA) program was created by the AIDS Housing Opportunities as part of the larger Cranston-Gonzales National Affordable Housing Act to provide housing assistance to low-income people living with HIV/AIDS. Eligible persons are partnered with housing agencies and non-profit organizations to provide stable housing. It is the only federal program focused on addressing persons living with HIV/AIDS and their beneficiaries. HOPWA divides its appropriations into two programs: 90% to eligible metropolitan areas and 10% for states to compete for nationally. The services include housing vouchers, short term rent/utility assistance, and home visits. Annually, over 100,000 people have received housing support/assistance. It funds over 1,000 HIV- positive households in New York alone and operates alongside NYCs' Continuum of Care program providing 7,148 units of permanent supportive housing, and has a fund of $78 million for rental assistance.

=== HIV/AIDS Services Administration ===
The HIV/AIDS Services Administration or HASA is a NYC program founded in 1985 to address the needs of people living with HIV/AIDS. It serves as a comprehensive case management system that offers a vast range of benefits including housing assistance, access to government benefits, and supportive services. The program was initially only available to those who were clinically symptomatic eligible for Cash Assistance but has since expanded since August 29, 2016, under the HASA for all initiative to apply to everyone regardless of symptomatic. Some benefits such as enhanced rent allowance are available statewide, however full service is restricted to NYC residents. These benefits include nutrition and transportation allowance and intensive case management. The NYC Human Resources Administration requires that households recertify and prove their eligibility after 12 months. It is the most widely used source for case management for those living with HIV in NYC. HASA serves over 33,000 people with over 80% being a recipient of some form of housing assistance.

=== Ryan White HIV/AIDS Program Part A ===
The Ryan White HIV/AIDS Program Part A issues federal grants to eligible metropolitan and transitional grant areas that assist in covering the cost of HIV care and support services. The program is part of the larger Ryan White CARE act. In order for a metropolitan area to be considered eligible, the areas must have at least 2,000 reported AIDS cases in a five-year window or 1,000-1,999 for transitional spaces.

== Chronic homelessness ==
Chronic homelessness is an issue that has been in New York City since the late 20th century, affected by changes in housing policy, deinstitutionalization, and decreasing access to affordable housing. Beginning in the 1980s and 1990s, researchers and policymakers saw that many citizens and families did not experience homelessness only as onetime occurrence but experienced repetition or long periods of staying in shelters. Early research done by Shinn went into depth about how structural factors such as limited housing availability, low income, and prior shelter use made it more likely that families would experience housing instability repeatedly after entering the shelter system. As a result of patterns, the policy of homelessness began to create a difference between chronic homelessness from short-term homelessness in an attempt to understand long-term shelter reliance better.

The U.S. Department of Housing and Urban Development later formalized the differentiation of the two by defining chronic homelessness as an experience that lasts at least one year or that involves repeated episodes over several years. This may also be combined with a disability. This definition shows the growing recognition that homelessness can be a cycle and not just a temporary problem, especially in large urban shelter systems like the ones in New York City.

=== Chronic homelessness and the shelter system ===
In New York City, people that experience chronic homelessness often repeatedly go through civil shelter systems rather than achieving long-term housing stability. Research has shown that past usage of shelters is a strong predictor of future shelter use as well, which causes patterns of repeated homelessness. Farrell reassesses risk measures for homelessness among families with children in New York City and finds that families who have used shelters in the past likely face a higher risk of returning to them, in recurring episodes rather than as a single event.

More recent analysis of the patterns of the recurring use of shelters supports this understanding of homelessness as being a cycle. A study of the Win Shelter Network found that a good number of families who left shelters returned later, with many of them going back within a relatively short period of time. This research shows that even after leaving shelters, many families remain vulnerable to housing instability due to repeated structural constraints, including the lack of affordable housing as well as a lack of long-term support. Overall, this research shows how chronic homelessness in New York City is closely related to the repeated use of shelters and public systems.

=== Scholarly critiques of chronic homelessness ===
Some scholars question how chronic homelessness is defined and managed within shelter-based systems. Craig Willse critiques the idea of chronic homelessness and argues that it can make certain people seem like they are permanently homeless and take their attention away from larger structural causes such as housing markets and economic inequality. Instead of focusing just on shelter use and service utilization, Willse argues that the category of chronic homelessness reflects political and administrative decisions about how homelessness is being handled. In New York City, this idea can go specifically hand in hand with research that shows the repeated use of shelters over time, bringing up questions on whether or not existing systems reasonably and effectively help put a stop to the cycle of homelessness or instead cause it to continue.

=== Ongoing challenges ===
As a result, chronic homelessness continues to serve as a major challenge for NYC's response system to homelessness. Research has regularly indicated that people and families who have prior use of shelter usually have an increased risk of returning to these shelters, reinforcing the idea of the pattern of homelessness being a cycle.

== Crimes relating to begging in New York ==
The administration of laws and regulations relating to begging in the state of New York is largely performed by each of the 62 cities of the state. Many of the state of New York's largest cities have introduced laws in the last decade prohibiting 'aggressive begging' in some form. The 1993 Loper case was a challenge to the state-wide law in the New York Penal Code §240.35(1) which made it an offence to loiter in a public place for the purpose of begging. New York City Police Department rarely issued fines under this law, but used it to 'move on' beggars.

In Loper, the Second Circuit Court of Appeals found begging in this case to be a First Amendment right, but still legal to ban in subways. A similar judgement was made in International Society for Krishna Consciousness, Inc. v. Lee in regard to New York City's airports, which found it reasonable to ban such activities in airports. However, the law still technically remained in force in the rest of New York state until it was repealed in 2010.

Some people in New York state were charged under that section of the law after Loper, but before it was repealed. Civil liberties groups have campaigned against the more targeted aggressive begging laws, however, they have been found to comply with the First Amendment. In 2010, New York City's current aggressive begging laws also withstood challenge in People v. Stroman.

== See also ==
- New York City housing shortage

General:

- Homelessness in the United States by state
