= WellCare =

American health insurance company

WellCare Health Plans, Inc.
- Type: Subsidiary
- Industry: Healthcare
- Founded: Tampa, Florida (1985)
- Headquarters: 8735 Henderson Road, Renaissance One, Tampa, Florida, United States
- Key people: Kenneth A. Burdick (CEO); Andrew L. Asher (CFO)
- Services: Managed care
- Revenue: ▲US$17.007 billion (2017)
- Operating income: ▼US$469 million (2017)
- Net income: ▲US$374 million (2017)
- Total assets: ▲US$8.365 billion (2017)
- Total equity: ▲US$2.417 billion (2017)
- Number of employees: 14,000 (October 2019)
- Parent: Centene Corporation
- Website: www.wellcare.com

WellCare Health Plans, Inc. is an American health insurance company that provides managed care services primarily through Medicaid, Medicare Advantage and Medicare Prescription Drug plans for members across the United States.

WellCare began operations in 1985 and has its headquarters in Tampa, Florida. It became a subsidiary of Centene Corporation in January 2020.

== History ==
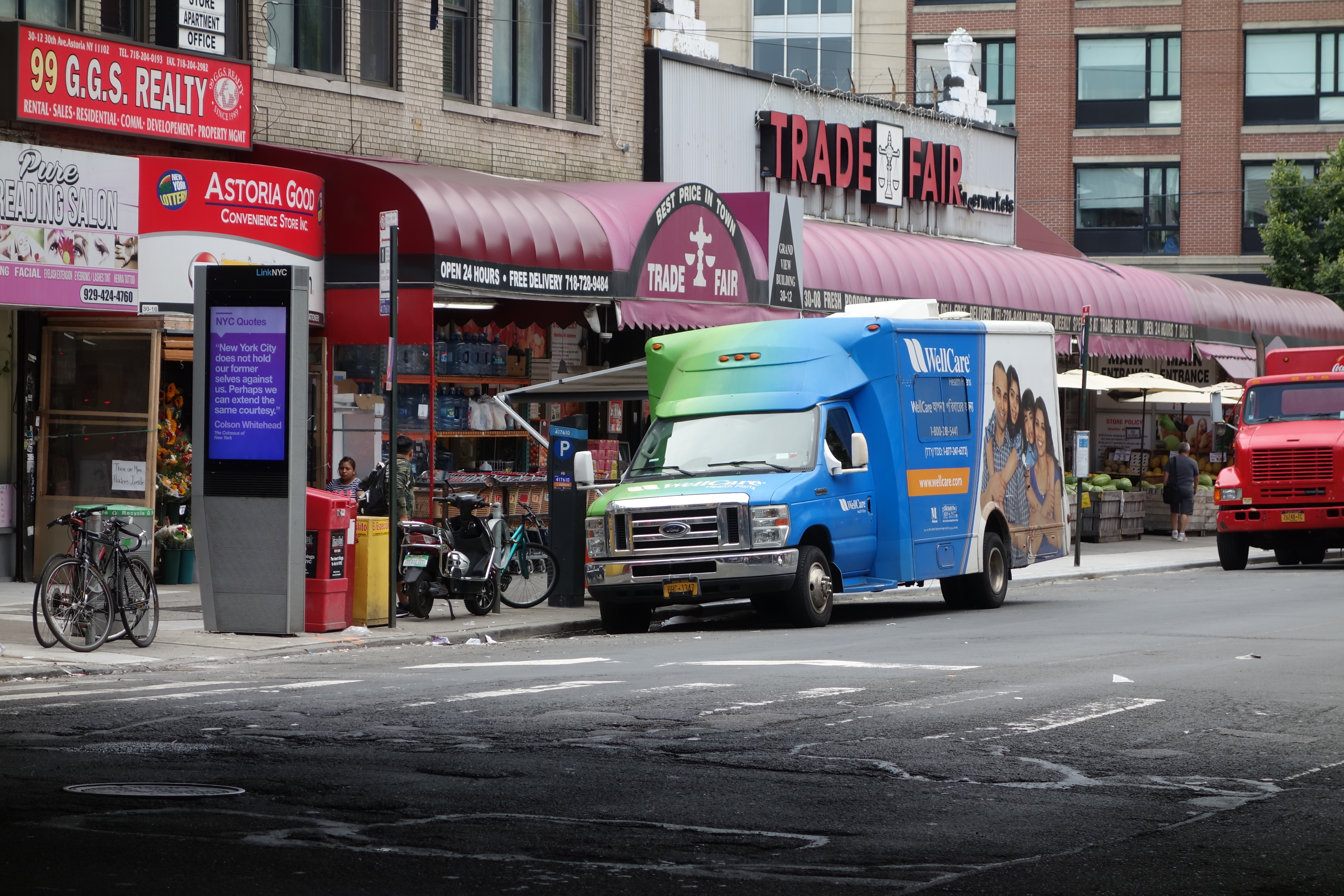
A WellCare bus in Astoria, Queens, New York City

WellCare began operations in 1985 in Tampa, Florida as a Medicaid provider for the State of Florida. In 1992, Kiran Patel, a cardiologist and entrepreneur, purchased the company.

In 2002, Patel sold it to a New York investment group led by George Soros and Todd Farha. That same year, Farha joined the company as CEO.

In 2004, WellCare became a public company via an initial public offering. The company opened on New York Stock Exchange with a sale of 7.3 million shares, each share priced at $17. In 2006, WellCare began offering Medicare Advantage plans with prescription drug benefits after the signing of the Medicare Prescription Drug, Improvement, and Modernization Act in 2003.

Also, in 2006, WellCare began offering Medicare Part D plans.

=== 2007 Florida investigations ===
On October 24, 2007, law enforcement agents executed a search warrant on WellCare's headquarters in Tampa, based on a whistleblower complaint that provided evidence of WellCare inflating patients' treatment costs and not returning overpayments to the state. The complaint also named several employees who knew about the activities.

In 2011, the SEC filed criminal charges against four WellCare executives. In 2013, the executives, including former CEO Todd Farha, were found guilty of the charges, including healthcare fraud and making false statements to law enforcement. Between 2008 and 2012, the company agreed to pay $217.5 million to settle the claims against them.

=== 2008–2019 ===
In January 2008, Heath Schiesser was promoted to president and CEO, replacing Todd Farha. Schiesser was replaced in December 2009 by Alec Cunningham.

In November 2013, WellCare appointed Chairman David Gallitano as interim CEO.

In 2018, 2019, and 2020 Fortune magazine named WellCare as one of the World's Most Admired Companies.

=== Centene acquisition ===
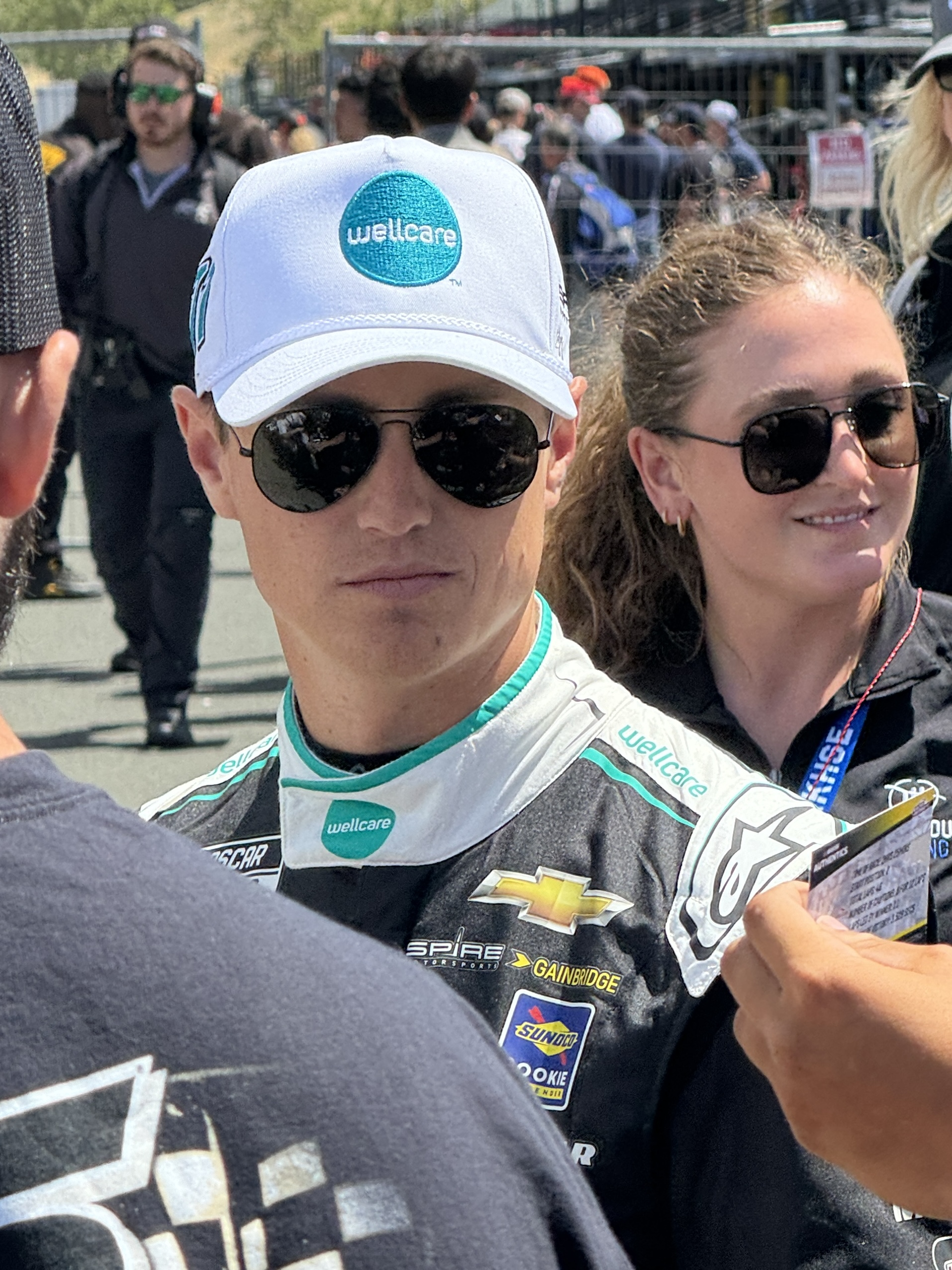
NASCAR Cup Series driver Zane Smith wearing a WellCare baseball cap at the 2024 Toyota/Save Mart 350. WellCare sponsored Smith in the 2024 NASCAR season.

In January 2020, Centene Corporation acquired the company for $17 billion. Following the merger, WellCare's CFO Andrew Asher became the CFO of Centene and CEO Kenneth Burdick joined the executive team at Centene.

== Acquisitions ==
In November 2012, Wellcare acquired Easy Choice Health Plan in California.

UnitedHealthcare's South Carolina Medicaid business was acquired in February 2013. In April of that year, Aetna's Medicaid business in Missouri, Missouri Care, was acquired.

The Windsor Health Group was acquired by WellCare in January 2014.

In January 2017 Care1st Health Plan Arizona, a subsidiary of Care1st Health Plan and Blue Shield of California affiliate was acquired. Wellcare purchased Universal American and Phoenix Health Plan, formerly a subsidiary of Abrazo Community Health Network, a subsidiary of Tenet Healthcare in May 2017.

Meridian Health Plans of Detroit, Michigan, was acquired in September 2018.

In September 2019, Aetna's Medicare prescription insurance business was acquired as a condition of CVS Health's acquisition of Aetna.

== See also ==
- EmblemHealth
