= Berkeley College =

Private for-profit college in New York and New Jersey, US

- Motto: Your potential is our promise.
- Type: Private for-profit college
- Established: 1931 (as The Berkeley School)
- President: Diane Recinos
- Provost: Patricia Greer
- Academic staff: 77 FT/273 PT (2025)
- Students: 4,128 (2025)
- Undergraduates: 3,536 (2025)
- Postgraduates: 592 (2025)
- Location: New York City and New Jersey, United States
- Campus: Urban and suburban
- Colors: Official Berkeley Blue and White
- Sporting affiliations: USCAA Division I/NACIA
- Mascot: Berkeley Knight
- Website: berkeleycollege.edu

Berkeley College is a private for-profit college with campuses in New York City, New Jersey, and online. It was founded in 1931 and offers undergraduate and graduate degrees and certificate programs. Berkeley College is accredited by the Middle States Commission on Higher Education. Its administrative headquarters are in Woodland Park, New Jersey.

== Academics ==
Berkeley College offers certificate, associate's, bachelor's, and graduate degree programs. The college serves a diverse student body of more than 4,000 students through The Larry L. Luing School of Business, School of Professional Studies, and School of Health Studies, on-site and online.

Berkeley College launched its first graduate degree program, a Master of Business Administration in 2015. Through Berkeley College's Corporate Learning Partnership, the MBA program partners with organizations like Affinity Federal Credit Union to offer master's degree and continuing education programs to employees. Berkeley College launched an MBA through the college's Larry L. Luing School of Business in Manhattan, NY, that was offered on-site at the Midtown Manhattan campus beginning in April 2022.

Berkeley College announced the launch of a Master of Science in Nursing program through its School of Health Studies in December 2021. With this program approval, Berkeley College – New Jersey has the only Licensed Practical Nurse-Bachelor of Science in Nursing-Master of Science in Nursing (LPN-BSN-MSN) pathway program in the State of New Jersey.

Berkeley has offered distance education courses since 1998. Berkeley has been ranked among the Best College for Online Bachelor's Degree Programs for 13 consecutive years.

== Campuses ==
The college has a New York City Campus in Midtown Manhattan, and three campuses in New Jersey, in Newark, Woodbridge, and Woodland Park. The school also offers programs through Berkeley College Online.

A number of Berkeley campuses have closed over the past decade. In 2014, the Berkeley College Extension Center on Williams Street in New York City was closed. Two years later, the college closed the Clifton, New Jersey, campus. In 2018, the Dover campus was closed with the Brooklyn campus closed the following year. Berkeley announced the closure of the White Plains campus in the fall of 2021 and consolidated it with its Manhattan campus. Berkeley announced the closure of the Paramus campus in spring 2022 and consolidated it with its Woodland Park campus.

Dover Business College was a vocational school and technical college with locations in Dover and Clifton, New Jersey. Dover Business College, which was founded in 1958 and accredited in 1974, was a private institution with a focus on preparing students for careers in healthcare, information technology, and business. The college awarded more than 2,800 diplomas in its last five years.

The school was merged into Berkeley College on July 1, 2013. Many of the programs that were offered at Dover Business College are now available at Berkeley College via the college's School of Health Studies, which was established to coincide with the merger.

== Legal issues ==
=== New York City ===
In 2015, Berkeley College was named in a New York City Consumer Agency investigation, along with 3 other for-profit schools, concerning student dropout and loan default rates, as well as how the college recruits new students.

In 2018, Berkeley College was named in a lawsuit filed by the New York Department of Consumer Affairs for deceptive and predatory practices. The lawsuit description includes (1) misleading students about financial aid, including federal financial aid; (2) tricking students into taking out loans directly from Berkeley College; (3) deceiving students about institutional grants; (4) deceiving students about transfer credits, majors, and careers; and (5) violating local debt collection laws by concealing its identity from former students when collecting debt, including debt that is not owed. Berkeley College denied the allegations contained in the DCA's lawsuit and denied that it violated the New York City Consumer Protection Law.

In 2022, the New York City Department of Consumer and Worker Protection (DCWP) reached a settlement with Berkeley College in connection with DCWP's 2018 lawsuit. The settlement requires Berkeley to, among other things, stop collection on any outstanding debt incurred before January 1, 2019, which Berkeley estimates is valued at a total of $20 million; pay $350,000 to the city, which DCWP plans to use to pay restitution to certain impacted consumers; and instruct its third-party debt collectors to request that credit reporting agencies remove all consumer account information related to student debt owed to Berkeley incurred before January 1, 2019.

=== White Plains ===
In 2019, Berkeley College was sued by former staffers at the White Plains, New York campus, who claimed they faced "a gender-related hostile work environment" and "wrongful termination." In July 2021, the Southern District of New York granted defendants' motion for summary judgment and dismissed the lawsuit against Berkeley College and all individual defendants. Thereafter, plaintiffs appealed their loss, and, in November 2022, the U.S. Court of Appeals for the 2nd Circuit affirmed the judgment of the SDNY.

== Athletics ==
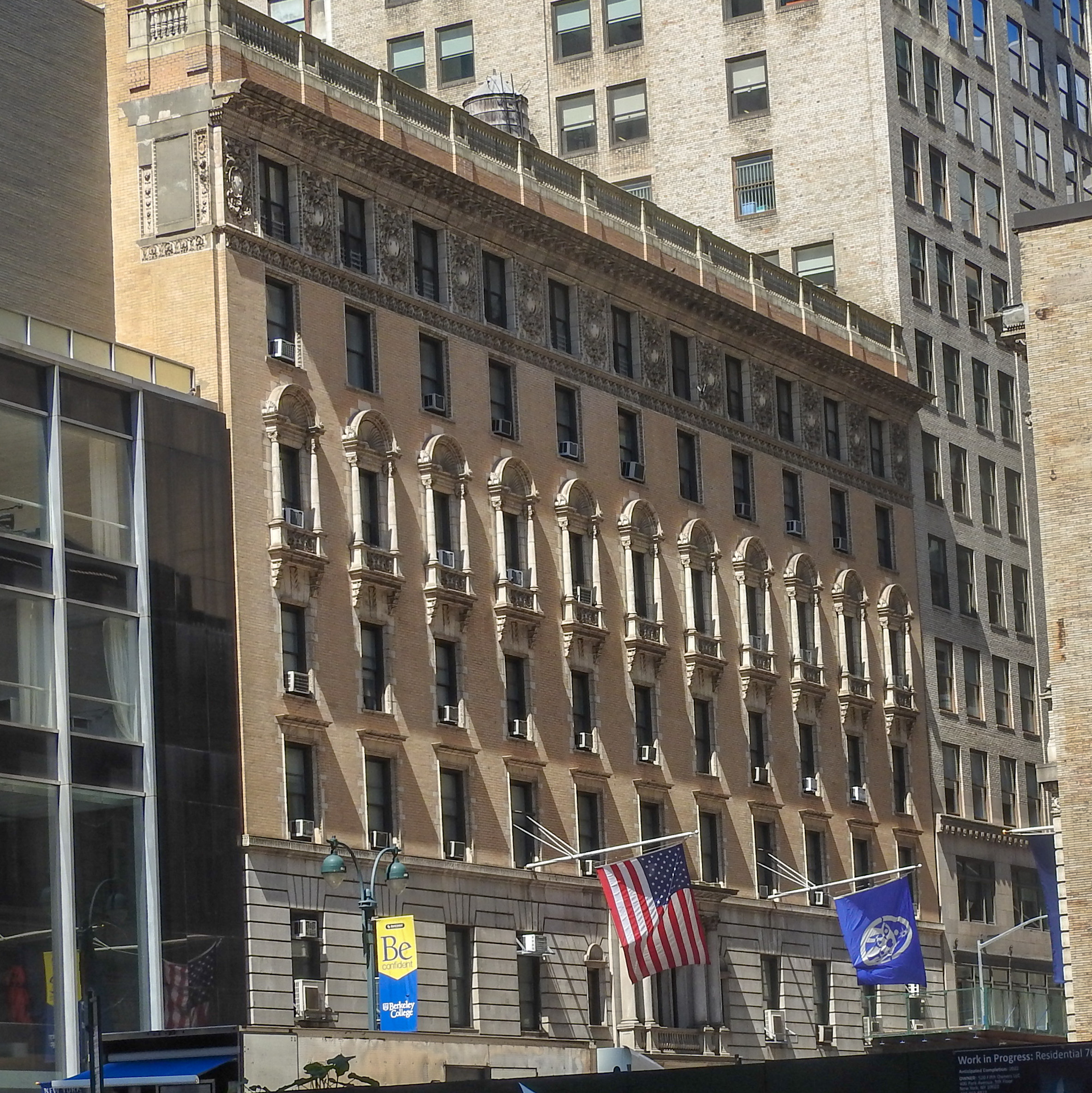
3 East 43rd Street building

Berkeley College Knights Athletics includes Basketball and Soccer teams. They compete in the United States Collegiate Athletic Association (USCAA) and the North American Conference for Intercollegiate Athletics. Chris Christiansen, Head Coach of the Men's Basketball team for 22 years, was inducted into the USCAA Hall of Fame, Class of 2023. Berkeley College, formerly a Division II athletic college, was promoted by the United States Collegiate Athletic Association to a Division I school for the 2024–2025 academic year.

== Notable alumni ==
- Monique Chandler-Waterman, member of the New York State Assembly
- BettyLou DeCroce, former member, New Jersey General Assembly
- Teresa Giudice, television personality best known for The Real Housewives of New Jersey
- Danielle Rose Russell, actress

== Notable faculty ==
- Monique Holsey-Hyman, former adjunct professor of social work
