= Illegal immigration to New York City =

Overview of the illegal immigrant to New York City

Illegal immigrants residing in New York City come from many parts of the world, especially Latin America, Asia, Eastern Europe, and the Caribbean. About 70% of them have paid work, in catering, construction, retail, driving, cleaning, and many other trades; at least in catering, their wages tend to be lower than those of comparable workers.

== Profile and demographics ==
According to a study by the Fiscal Policy Institute, about 4.08 million immigrants lived in New York State in 2007, and according to the Migration Policy Institute, about 4.47 million immigrants lived in the state in 2014. Of the immigrants in the state, about three million live in New York City. The number of immigrants living in New York City increased only slightly from 2000 to 2011, with an increase from 2,871,032 to 3,066,599 residents being born outside the United States.

A 2007 report by Fiscal Policy Institute estimated there were 535,000 illegal immigrants in New York City. In all, undocumented immigrants make up 18 percent of all immigrants living in New York City. Undocumented immigrants in New York City come from a wide array of countries from all over the globe. According to an estimate by Jeffrey S. Passel of the Pew Hispanic Center, 27 percent of undocumented immigrants in New York City come from Mexico and Central America, 23 percent come from South Asia and East Asia, 22 percent come from the Caribbean, 13 percent come from South America, eight percent come from Europe, five percent come from Africa, and two percent come from the Middle East.

== Participation in labor force ==
Although undocumented immigrants do not have legal permanent status in the country, locally they have a significant presence in the city's economy and job market. As former New York City Mayor Michael Bloomberg explained, "Although [illegal aliens] broke the law by illegally crossing our borders or over-staying their visas and our businesses broke the law by employing them, our city’s economy would be a shell of itself had they not, and it would collapse if they were deported." According to a Fiscal Policy Institute analysis of 2000 to 2006 data, there are 374,000 undocumented immigrant workers in New York City, which makes up 10 percent of the resident workforce. With 374,000 out of 535,000 illegal immigrant workers working in New York City, undocumented immigrants have a labor force participation rate of roughly 70 percent. This percentage is higher than the labor force participation rate for native-born residents, 60 percent, or for overall foreign-born residents, 64 percent, in New York City.

Undocumented immigrants can be found working in almost every industry in New York City performing a wide variety of tasks. More than half of all dishwashers in the city are unlawful residents, as are a third of all sewing machine operators, painters, cooks, construction laborers, and food preparation workers. Illegal immigrant workers also make up close to 30 percent of the city's automotive service technicians and mechanics, waiters, maids and housekeeping cleaners, and carpenters. The five occupations with the most undocumented immigrants in New York City are cooks (21,000), janitors and building cleaners (19,000), construction laborers (17,000), maids and housekeeping cleaners (16,000), and waiters (15,000).

Occupation	Number (estimate)	As proportion of all workers
Dishwashers	11,000	54%
Sewing machine operators	12,000	35%
Painters, construction & maintenance	7,000	33%
Cooks	21,000	33%
Construction laborers	17,000	32%
Food preparation workers	6,000	32%
Waiters & waitresses	15,000	28%
Maids & housekeeping cleaners	16,000	28%
Automotive service technicians & mechanics	5,000	26%
Carpenters	20,000	50%
Taxi drivers & chauffeurs	11,000	20%
Stock clerks & order fillers	7,000	19%
Janitors & building cleaners	19,000	19%
Laborers & freight, stock & material movers	6,000	16%
Driver/sales workers & truck drivers	9,000	15%
Cashiers	10,000	12%
Retail salespersons	10,000	12%
Child care workers	7,000	12%
Office clerks, general	5,000	12%
First-line supervisors of retail sales workers	8,000	10%
Other occupations	163,000	6%
Total undocumented labor force	374,000	10%

=== Restaurant industry ===
The restaurant industry may be the industry that employs the most illegal aliens. In 2007, 36 percent of restaurant workers were illegal aliens. According to a 2008 estimate from the Pew Hispanic Center, about 20 percent of the nearly 2.6 million chefs, head cooks and cooks in the United States are illegal aliens. According to a 2005 report by the Restaurant Opportunities Center of New York and the New York City Restaurant Industry Coalition, illegal alien workers in the restaurant industry in New York City receive substantially lower wages than legal workers. According to the report, the median wage of all restaurant workers in the city was $8.00 an hour. However, when illegal alien workers’ earnings were taken out of the sample, the median wage rose to $9.00 an hour. A Manhattan chef and restaurateur explained, "We always, always hire the undocumented aliens… It’s not just me, it’s everybody in the industry. First, they are willing to do the work. Second, they are willing to learn. Third, they are not paid as well. It’s an economic decision. It’s less expensive to hire an undocumented person."

=== Mexican immigrants ===
According to an analysis of the most recently available census data, Mexican immigrants have the highest rate of employment among the city's 10 largest immigrant groups, and they are more likely to hold jobs than New York City's native-born population. Based on the 2008 census data, about 75 percent of all Mexicans in the city between ages 16 and 65 are in the civilian labor force and only around four percent of them are unemployed, which is well below the nation's current unemployment rate of 9.6%. Experts say the main reason so many of these undocumented workers are employed is because they are in the country illegally, and, consequently, are less likely to report workplace abuses to the authorities for fear of deportation. As a result, many of these workers hold jobs that pay less than the minimum wage and require them to work 100-hour work weeks.

== Social and fiscal impacts ==
=== Education ===
In 1996, New York City mayor Rudy Giuliani stated: "The reality is that [illegal aliens] are here, and they're going to remain here. The choice becomes for a city what do you do? Allow them to stay on the streets or allow them to be educated? The preferred choice from the point of view of New York City is to be educated."

=== Law enforcement ===
Although the New York City Police Department (NYPD) does not check immigration status of people seeking medical attention or education services, it does check the immigration status of anyone who commits a crime.

== Laws ==
In October 1986, Congress passed the Immigration Reform and Control Act (IRCA), which authorized legalization for illegal immigrants who could prove they had resided in the U.S. continually, although without appropriate documentation, since January 1, 1982.

Mayor Bloomberg explained, "Our general policy in this area protects the confidentiality of law-abiding immigrants, regardless of their status, when they report a crime or visit a hospital or send their children to school." In New York State, resident illegal immigrants can get a driver's license. They also pay the same tuition rates as other residents to attend a New York state university or other public university. New York state supports the Deferred Action for Parents of Americans and Deferred Action for Childhood Arrivals executive actions taken by Barack Obama, which allowed about four million illegal immigrants to receive work permits and be protected from deportation.

On September 17, 2003, Bloomberg issued Executive Order 41 to protect the privacy of illegal immigrants and to grant them access to City services that they need and are entitled to receive. According to Executive Order 41, if an illegal immigrant goes to a City agency to request certain services or benefits, City employees will not ask about their immigration status unless it is required by law, or necessary to determine whether they are eligible to receive those services or benefits. Furthermore, if an illegal immigrant is the victim or witness of a crime, or if they call or approach the police seeking assistance, police officers will not inquire about their immigration status.

In January 2017, President Donald Trump enacted a new executive order that would allow illegal immigrants nationwide to be deported on lesser charges than previously. Over the week of February 6, 2017, six hundred people in 11 states, including 41 people in the New York City area, were arrested by U.S. Immigration and Customs Enforcement. The ICE stated that of those arrested in the New York City area, 95% of those arrested were criminal aliens. Specifically, of the 41 arrested, 38 had at least one criminal conviction. The New York City raids had been planned since January and focused mainly on people who immigrated from Central American countries. The ICE had arrested more illegal immigrants in the New York metropolitan area in previous raids, including 58 in an August 2016 raid. However, the new ICE raids under Trump's presidency represented an increased enforcement of immigration policy, including detaining and potentially deporting 8 million of the country's estimated 11 million illegal immigrants. As a result, after the February raids, there were reports of increases in people looking for free legal help from immigrant-rights law firms. The NYPD said that it was not involved in the raids. ICE arrested a further 104 people in the New York area in July 2017.

After being greatly reduced in number during Joe Biden's lone term in office, the arrests and raids returned to their previous levels in Trump's second term in office, particularly highly publicized raids of the counterfeit goods vendors along Manhattan's Canal Street in late October 2025, and further arrests after protests outside one hospital in Bushwick, Brooklyn, just after the start of May 2026.

== See also ==
- New York City migrant housing crisis
- Sanctuary city

== Bibliography ==
- Ciment, James, ed. "New York City". Encyclopedia of American Immigration. Vol. 3. Armonk, NY: M.E Sharpe, 2001.
- Krase, Jerome, and Ray Hutchison. Race and Ethnicity in New York City. Vol. 7. Oxford, UK: Elsevier Ltd, 2004.
