= Medicare Rights Center =

Nonprofit in the United States

The Medicare Rights Center is a nonprofit organization founded in June 1989 as the Medicare Beneficiaries Defense Fund (MBDF) by Diane Archer. The organization's self-declared mission is to "ensure access to affordable health care for older adults and people with disabilities through counseling and advocacy, educational programs, and public policy initiatives."

One of the first actions of the MBDF was to bring a 1989 lawsuit brought against the federal government on the grounds that the Medicare Explanation of Benefits (EOB) failed to mention limits on what a doctor may charge for a service or what a beneficiary must pay.

That same year, Archer set up a "national consumer helpline" in order to provide counseling to Medicare recipients. The helpline then publishes an 'annual trends report' summarizing the content of these calls made to the Center.

The Medicare Rights Center also maintains an online reference and coursework tool called Medicare Interactive (MI).
