= Universal American =

Universal American Corporation
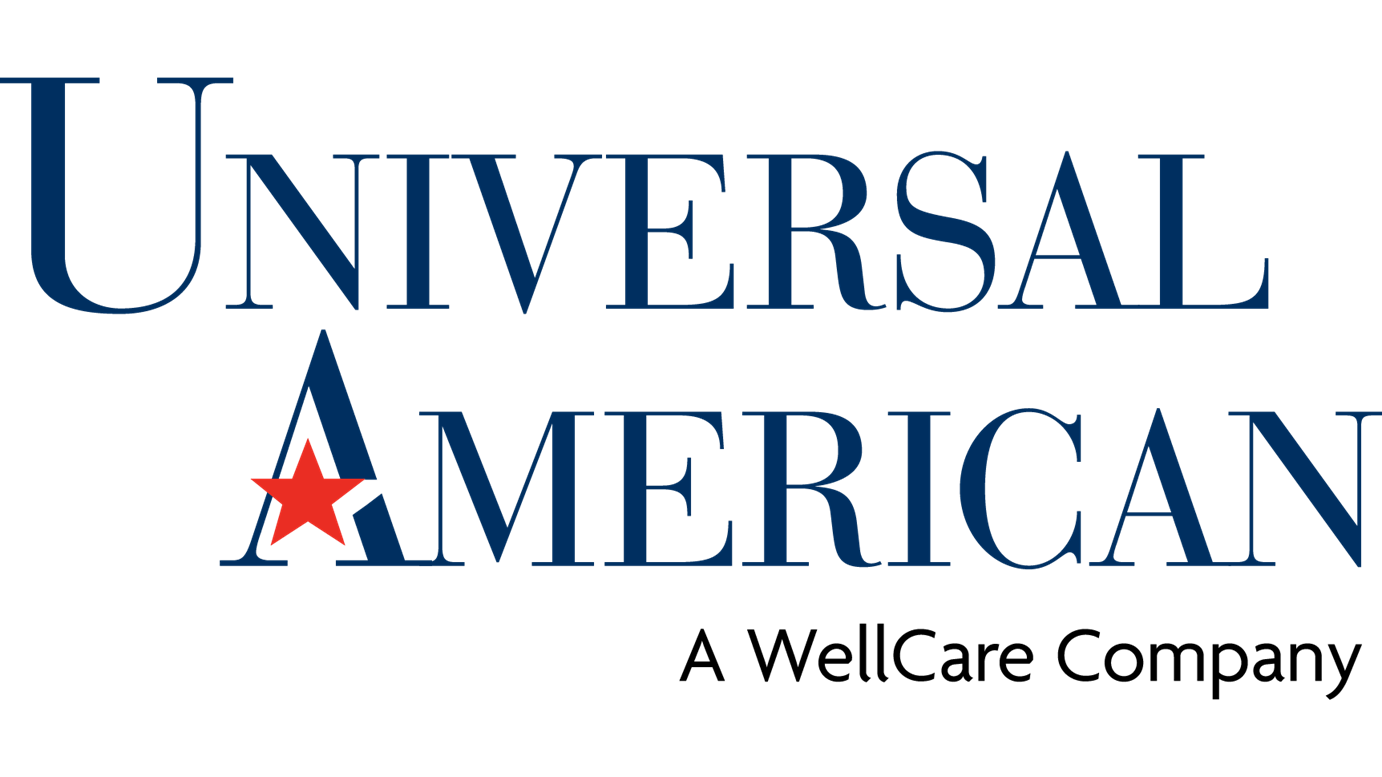
- UAM logo after Wellcare acquisition
- Company type: Public
- Traded as: NYSE: UAM
- Industry: Health Insurance
- Headquarters: White Plains, New York
- Website: universalamerican.com

Universal American was a Fortune 500 company with offices throughout the United States, and headquarters in Rye Brook, New York. The company offered health insurance, and also deals in Medicare managed care plans, and Medicare prescription drug benefits. Its CEO is Richard A. Barasch.

== History ==
The company was incorporated as a stock health insurance company on September 22, 1945, under the name American Progressive Health Insurance Company of New York. In 1991, Richard Barasch was elected to chairman of the board and chief executive officer.

In 1998 Universal American Financial Corporation (Universal American) agreed to a Share Purchase Agreement with Capital Z Financial Services, a NYC based Private Equity Firm. Capital Z acquired approximately a 59.7% controlling interest in the company for approximately $81 million.

The company, then known as American Exchange, utilized the proceeds from the Capital Z transaction to acquire various subsidiaries of the former PennCorp Financial Group, Inc: Pennsylvania Life Insurance Company (“PLIC”), Constitution Life Insurance Company, Union Bankers Insurance Company, Marquette National Life Insurance Company, PennCorp Life Insurance Company (Canada), and Peninsular Life Insurance Company.

In 2007, Universal American acquired MemberHealth, LLC a privately held pharmacy benefit manager and sponsor of Community Care Rx, a national Medicare Part D plan with more than 1.1 million members. In conjunction with the acquisition, Universal American Financial Corporation changed its name to Universal American Corporation (UAM) in December 2011 and listed on the New York Stock Exchange. CEO Richard Barasch remarked: "“We are delighted to be making the move to the Big Board. As our business grows and diversifies, especially following the completion of our recent merger with MemberHealth, raising Universal American's visibility among the population we serve and in the financial markets becomes increasingly more important. We are proud of the performance we’ve delivered to shareholders and view our listing on the Exchange as an important milestone in the evolution of our company.”

In 2011, CVS Caremark acquired Universal American's Medicare Part D business for $1.25 billion. At the time, Universal American's Part D business served about 1.9 million members, more than doubling CVS Caremark's members to a combined 3.1 million. Per Lofberg, president of Caremark Pharmacy Services, said the deal further highlights the company's position as "a significant player in one of the nation's fastest-growing segments of the Pharmacy Benefit Management industry."

In 2016, WellCare acquired Universal American in a deal worth an estimated $800 million.
