= Coalition for the Homeless =

Nonprofit based in New York, United States

Coalition for the Homeless is a not-for-profit advocacy group focused on homelessness in New York. The coalition has engaged in landmark litigation to protect the rights of homeless people, including the right to shelter and the right to vote, and also advocates for long-term solutions to the problem of homelessness. Formed in 1981, the Coalition has offices in New York City and Albany, New York.

The Coalition provides food, clothing, eviction prevention, crisis services, permanent housing, job training and special programs for youth to more than 3,500 homeless men, women, and children daily in New York.

== Litigation ==
In 1979, in the case Callahan v. Carey, attorney and founder of the Coalition Robert Hayes, achieved a landmark precedent in New York City, establishing that all homeless individuals have the right to emergency shelter.

In Pitts v. Black, a 1984 lawsuit, the Coalition successfully argued that homeless people in New York should be permitted to register to vote even if they reside in shelters or on the streets.

== Other services and programs ==
The Coalition for the Homeless has a number of programs that assist more than 3,500 homeless and at-risk New Yorkers each day. These programs include:

- Permanent housing for families, individuals, and people with AIDS.
- A mobile soup kitchen serving 1,000 hot nutritious meals in 22 sites every night.
- Job training and placement.
- A summer camp for homeless children.
- An after school tutoring and recreation program.
- Crisis intervention services that help people keep their housing and get food, clothing, and shelter.
- Rental assistance with counseling.

== See also ==
- Homelessness in the United States
- Homeless vote in United States
- Poverty in the United States
