= Callahan v. Carey =

Callahan v. Carey was a landmark case in the New York County Supreme Court that established the duty of New York State to provide shelter for homeless men. It was brought in 1979 as a class action suit, the first such suit by advocates for the homeless in the United States, and settled with the negotiation in 1981 of a consent decree governing the provision of homeless shelters by New York City.

== Background ==
During the 1970s, the number of homeless people in New York City expanded noticeably. Section I of Article XVII of the New York State Constitution, passed as an amendment in 1938 at the urging of New York City mayor Fiorello La Guardia, reads:

The aid, care and support of the needy are public concerns and shall be provided by the state and by such of its subdivisions, and in such manner and by such means, as the legislature may from time to time determine.

Robert Hayes, a 26-year-old graduate of New York University Law School working for Sullivan & Cromwell, had discussed the plight of the homeless with two friends studying at Columbia University, Ellen Baxter and Kim Hopper, who had interviewed many homeless persons. He decided to bring a class action suit on the basis of the constitutional provision, acting pro bono.

== Lawsuit ==
Hayes brought suit in October 1979 in New York County Supreme Court (the trial court for Manhattan) against the state in the person of the then governor, Hugh L. Carey, on behalf of three homeless men who said the city had sometimes offered them no emergency accommodations and other times offered them only beds in the "Big Room", a substandard overflow area in a former municipal shelter. The lead plaintiff was Robert Callahan, a 53-year-old former short-order cook and Bowery alcoholic, who was found dead soon after the case was decided.

It was Hayes' first experience trying a case. He argued from the intent of the supporters and drafters of the amendment as represented in documents from the time, and specifically on the word "shall", and presented arguments that the city's Men's Shelter provided insufficient beds and that what shelter was available was unsafe and unhealthy. When arguments ended in late October, Hayes requested an expedited ruling in view of approaching winter.

Justice Andrew Tyler ruled in favor of the plaintiffs on December 5, 1979, holding that under the state constitution "the Bowery derelicts are entitled to Board and lodging" and that the city had not made adequate provision for housing "all of the destitute and homeless alcoholics, addicts, mentally impaired derelicts, flotsam and jetsam, and others during the winter months". A temporary injunction directed the city to provide emergency beds. The suit had asked for 750, which the city requested be replaced by a flexible provision; the number it had to provide rapidly rose to 1,000 per night.

Disputes and court orders arising from Callahan concerned many aspects of the administration of New York City facilities for the homeless. A consent decree negotiated under the court's auspices and finalized on August 26, 1981 recorded the state's obligation to provide "food, shelter, supervision and security" to all homeless men applying. It set standards for shelters and emergency hotel accommodations for which the homeless were issued vouchers, including capacity limits, staff to resident ratios, and specifications regarding beds, bathroom facilities, and additional services, such as mail, telephone, laundry, and secure storage.

It also required the city to report regularly on the state of the shelters to the plaintiffs' attorneys. The consent decree preempted a definitive court ruling on the constitutional right to shelter. In a 2003 appellate court ruling, it was held not to be violated by the withholding of shelter for 30 days to conform with changed welfare rules.

== Long-term effects ==
The case led in New York State to Eldredge v. Koch, decided in December 1982, in which the right to accommodation established in Callahan was extended to homeless women, and McCain v. Koch, decided in May 1986, which extended it to homeless families. Further litigation determined that people with AIDS must also be housed. It also led to Hayes, Baxter, and Hopper founding the Coalition for the Homeless in 1981. Advocates for the homeless in other states and the District of Columbia followed suit in seeking to establish a right to housing through the courts.

It has been argued that the choice of the courts as the avenue for seeking assistance for the homeless and the failure to involve the poor and minorities led to a system that diverted resources, reduced goodwill, and may have further reduced the supply of permanent housing available to poor families.

Regardless of arguments or good will, one practical effect is New York provides a shelter to a much larger percentage of its homeless population than many other major US cities, (see chart in reference) which was the intent of the ruling.

== See also ==
- Homelessness in New York
