= Community Healthcare Network =

Community Healthcare Network (CHN) provides primary care, mental health and social services in New York City. All of its locations are designated as a Federally Qualified Health Center by the Bureau of Primary Health Care. It is also an affiliate member of NewYork-Presbyterian Hospital.

== History ==
In 1981, twelve family planning clinics started in the late 1960s in New York City merged to become the Community Family Planning Council. In 1984, the clinics became the first family planning provider in New York State to offer prenatal care and professional social work services. The clinics expanded to include primary care, mental health and social services and in 1998 the name was changed to Community Healthcare Network. Catherine M. Abate has been president and CEO since 1999, until her death in 2014. Robert Hayes is currently the president and CEO.

== Location ==
=== Manhattan ===
- Catherine M. Abate Health Center (formerly downtown health center)
- Community League Health Center
- Helen B. Atkinson Health Center

=== Brooklyn ===
- CABS Health Center
- Caribbean House Health Center
- Dr. Betty Shabazz Health Center

=== Bronx ===
- Bronx Health Center
- Tremont Health Center

=== Queens ===
- Long Island City Health Center
- Queens Health Center
- Family Health Center

=== Other ===
CHN also operates three mobile health units. Two are dedicated to general care, one is dedicated to ocular care.

== Awards and recognition ==
In 2007, Community Healthcare Network received accreditation from The Joint Commission by demonstrating compliance with national standards for health care quality and safety.

== See also ==
- The New York Foundation
