= Thak Thak gang =

Indian criminal group

The Thak Thak gang ("Knock Knock gang") is a notorious criminal group primarily active in North India, especially in the National Capital Region. The group specializes in targeting parked vehicles and also employs deceptive tactics to distract victims before stealing cash and valuables. The group frequently changes its location to evade arrest.

== Name ==
The name "Thak-Thak" (ठक्-ठक्) is derived from the onomatopoeia of knocking on a vehicle's glass window or door as a means to divert attention of the passengers or driver, while gang members execute their looting operation.

== Operation ==
The Thak Thak group operates using a deceptive modus operandi to target their victims. They engage in activities such as observing contents of vehicles to determine if any valuable items are inside. Subsequently, they divert the driver's attention, distracting the victim while stealing and escaping with the stolen goods.

The Thak Thak gang operates predictably. First by stopping a chosen vehicle by puncturing the tires or spilling oil on the bonnet (hood), and getting the attention of the driver, so the driver must stop to see what has happened to the vehicle. Members of the gang remain nearby, then ambush to steal laptop bags, mobile phones, and other valuables that are left unseen by the owner.

An Additional Sessions Judge in the Okhla area of South East Delhi fell victim to the Thak Thak gang on 24 September 2019. The gang members employed their distraction technique, subsequently breaking the car window and stealing a small black purse.

=== Tyre puncture ===
The "Thak Thak" gang tricks drivers and passengers into believing that their vehicle has a puncture, urging them to investigate the situation. In one such incident, gang members riding a motorcycle pursued a German woman who was en route to attend the Surajkund Mela in Faridabad. They subtly indicated to her driver that there was a puncture in their car's tyre. Upon the driver's inspection a gang member approached the car, opened the rear seat door, and seized her bag containing Rs. 60,000 in cash, and swiftly departed from the scene.

=== Spilling oil and oil leakage ===
Additionally, the Thak Thak gang employs a method by spilling oil and causing oil leakage to compel drivers to exit the vehicle and investigate. In 2023, the gang targeted a car where two individuals on a motorcycle approached the occupants of the vehicle, claiming they had an oil leak. Consequently, both the driver and the passenger exited the car to inspect it. Meanwhile, two more gang members on another motorcycle approached from behind and absconded with belongings stored in the car's rear compartment. This incident took place in Seelampur.

In another case, the gang members robbed a woman while she was on her way to Rohini in Delhi. They distracted her by claiming there was a petrol leak in the vehicle. When she stepped out to investigate, they quickly seized her bag, which contained valuables.

=== Breaking windowpanes ===
The group utilizes catapults (slingshots) to shatter the windowpanes of parked cars and make off with the valuables stored within, as reported by the Noida police, and Delhi Police.

=== Baiting ===
The members of the Thak Thak group bait victims by placing currency notes near the tire and informing the driver that they have dropped a banknote. This tactic is employed to divert the driver's attention and entice them to exit the vehicle in order to collect the notes.

=== Chemical spraying ===
The gang employs chemical spray to stop vehicles and force drivers to exit. According to one woman, gang members sprayed a chemical substance on the car's bonnet, causing white fumes to enter through the air conditioning vents. This resulted in breathing difficulties and burning sensations on her skin, forcing her to leave the vehicle and catch her breath on the roadside.

=== Vandalism ===
Actress Farheen was targeted by a gang member who vandalised her car and stole her wallet. Upon Farheen halting her car at a traffic signal, four assailants attempted to vandalise her vehicle. Subsequently, when she parked her car and attempted to speak with them, the robbers subjected her to verbal abuse, accusing her of inadequate driving skills.

== Similar gangs ==
The police have encountered two other gangs in recent years. One is known as the Chaddi Baniyan gang, notorious for applying oil to their bodies to facilitate difficult capture. They also wear masks during their robberies to conceal their identities. The second gang specializes in chain snatching, the practice of ripping jewelry off of pedestrians.

== See also ==
- Kala Kachcha gang
