= Looting =

Indiscriminate taking of goods by force

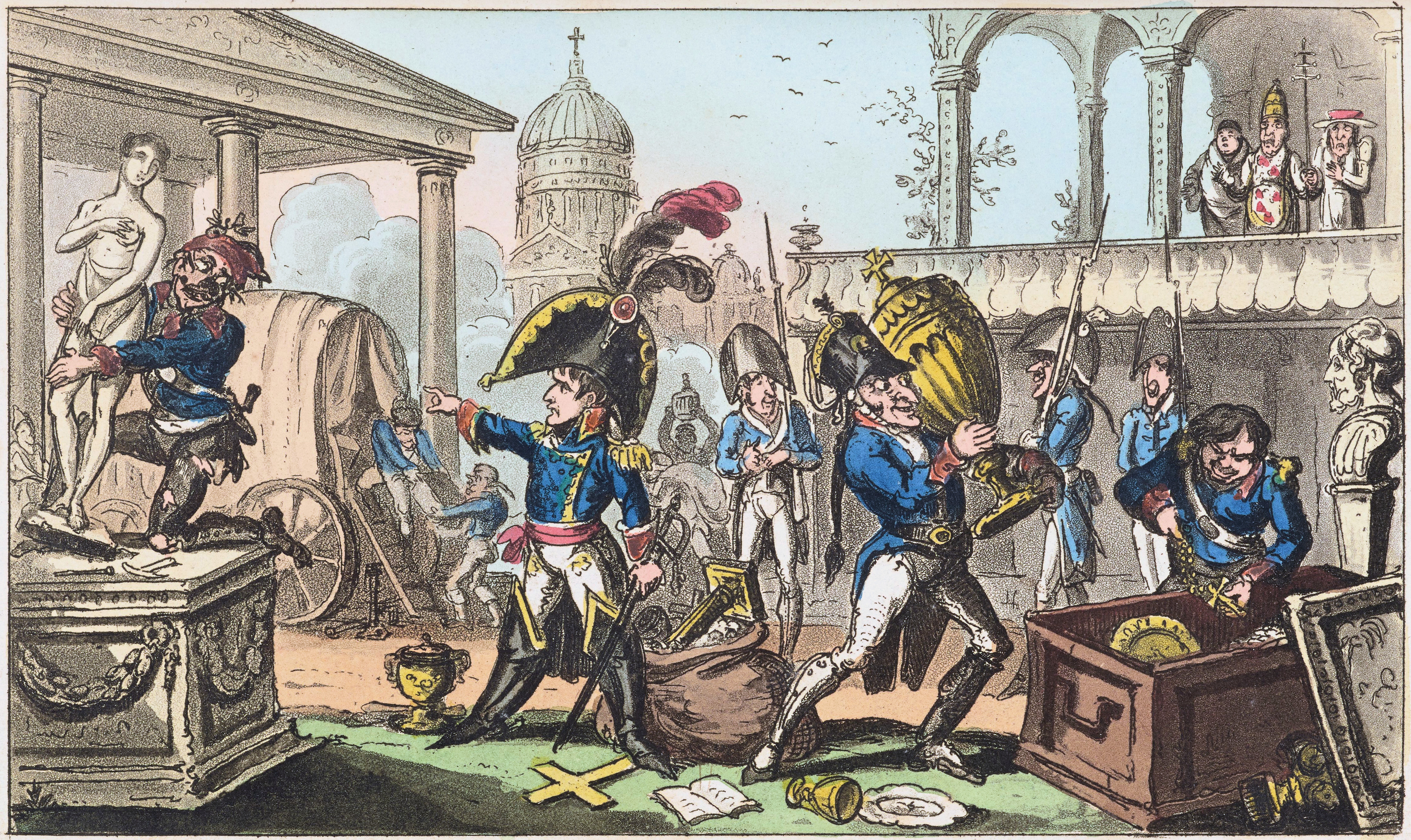
Cartoon mocking the Napoleonic looting of art by French troops

Looting is the act of stealing, or the taking of goods by force, typically in the midst of a military, political, or other social crisis, such as war, natural disasters (where law and civil enforcement are temporarily ineffective), or rioting. The proceeds of all these activities can be described as booty, loot, plunder, spoils, or pillage. Throughout history, the practice of war looting was often considered a customary right of victorious armies until the development of modern international humanitarian law.

Looting by a victorious army during war has been a common practice throughout recorded history. In the wake of the Napoleonic Wars and particularly after World War II, norms against wartime plunder became widely accepted. In modern armed conflicts, looting is prohibited by international law, and constitutes a war crime. The Hague Conventions of 1899 and 1907 explicitly prohibited pillage and looting, codifying earlier efforts to restrain the practice in European warfare.

== After disasters ==
During a disaster, police and military forces are sometimes unable to prevent looting when they are overwhelmed by humanitarian or combat concerns, or they cannot be summoned because of damaged communications infrastructure. Especially during natural disasters, many civilians may find themselves forced to take what does not belong to them in order to survive. How to respond to that and where the line between unnecessary "looting" and necessary "scavenging" lies are often dilemmas for governments. In other cases, looting may be tolerated or even encouraged by governments for political or other reasons, including religious, social or economic ones.

Following major disasters, reports of widespread looting are often amplified by media coverage, despite disaster research showing that post-disaster looting behavior is cooperative rather than criminal. Scholars in disaster sociology have argued that narratives of lawlessness exaggerate the scale of looting and can reinforce stereotypes about affected communities. Research conducted after Hurricane Katrina, for example, found that many widely circulated reports of violent crime and mass lootings were inaccurate or overstated as many incidents involved communities attempting to obtain essential supplies like food or water. Researchers have also distinguished between opportunistic theft and survival-driven behavior in situations where access to resources and emergency assistance has broken down.

Disaster researchers have also observed that perceptions of looting can influence emergency response policies and public behavior during crises. Fears of widespread lawlessness have, in come cases, led authorities to prioritize security and policing over humanitarian assistance. Studies following Hurricane Katrina found that exaggerated reports of violence and looting contributed to delays in aid and reinforced public misconceptions about how people were behaving during disasters. Researchers generally argue that solidarity and cooperation are far more common responses than panic or criminal activity, a contrast to what is often portrayed in news and media outlets.

Some disaster researchers have argued that reports of looting following disasters can reflect broader social racial tensions instead of actual patterns of criminal behavior. Analyses of media coverage after Hurricane Katrina found that similar actions were described differently depending on the individuals involved. For example, Black residents were more frequently portrayed as "looters" while white residents were described as "finding" or "recovering" supplies. Scholars and sociologists have cited these differences as evidence that disaster narratives can reinforce existing social inequalities and shape public perceptions of affected communities. These portrayals may influence political responses and the allocation of emergency resources during disaster recovery.

== History ==
=== In armed conflict ===
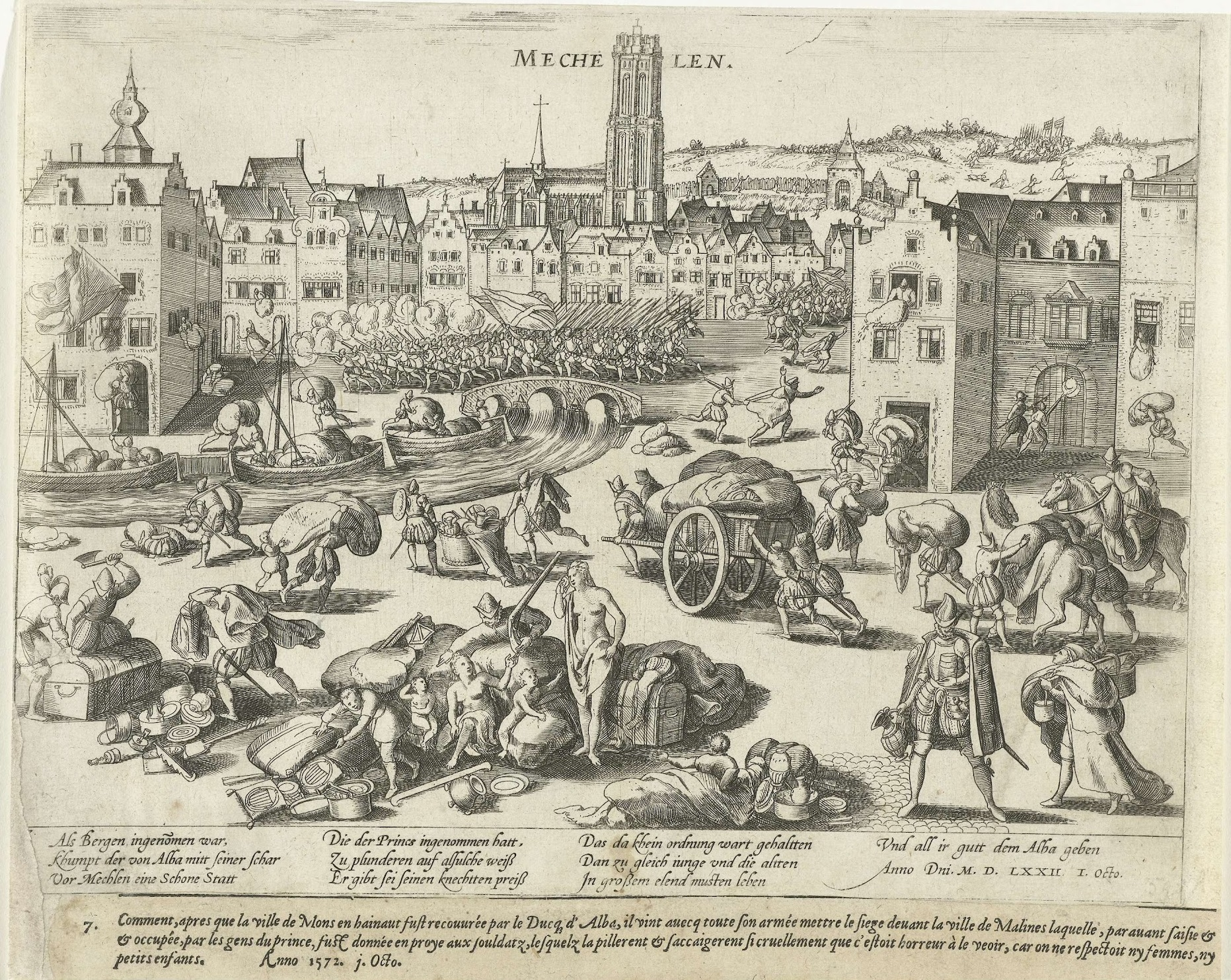
The sacking and looting of Mechelen by Spanish troops led by the Duke of Alba, 2 October 1572

Looting by a victorious army during war has been a common practice throughout recorded history. Foot soldiers viewed plunder as a way to supplement an often-meagre income and transferred wealth became part of the celebration of victory. In the wake of the Napoleonic Wars and particularly after World War II, norms against wartime plunder became widely accepted.

In the upper ranks, the proud exhibition of the loot plundered formed an integral part of the typical Roman triumph, and Genghis Khan was not unusual in proclaiming that the greatest happiness was "to vanquish your enemies ... to rob them of their wealth".

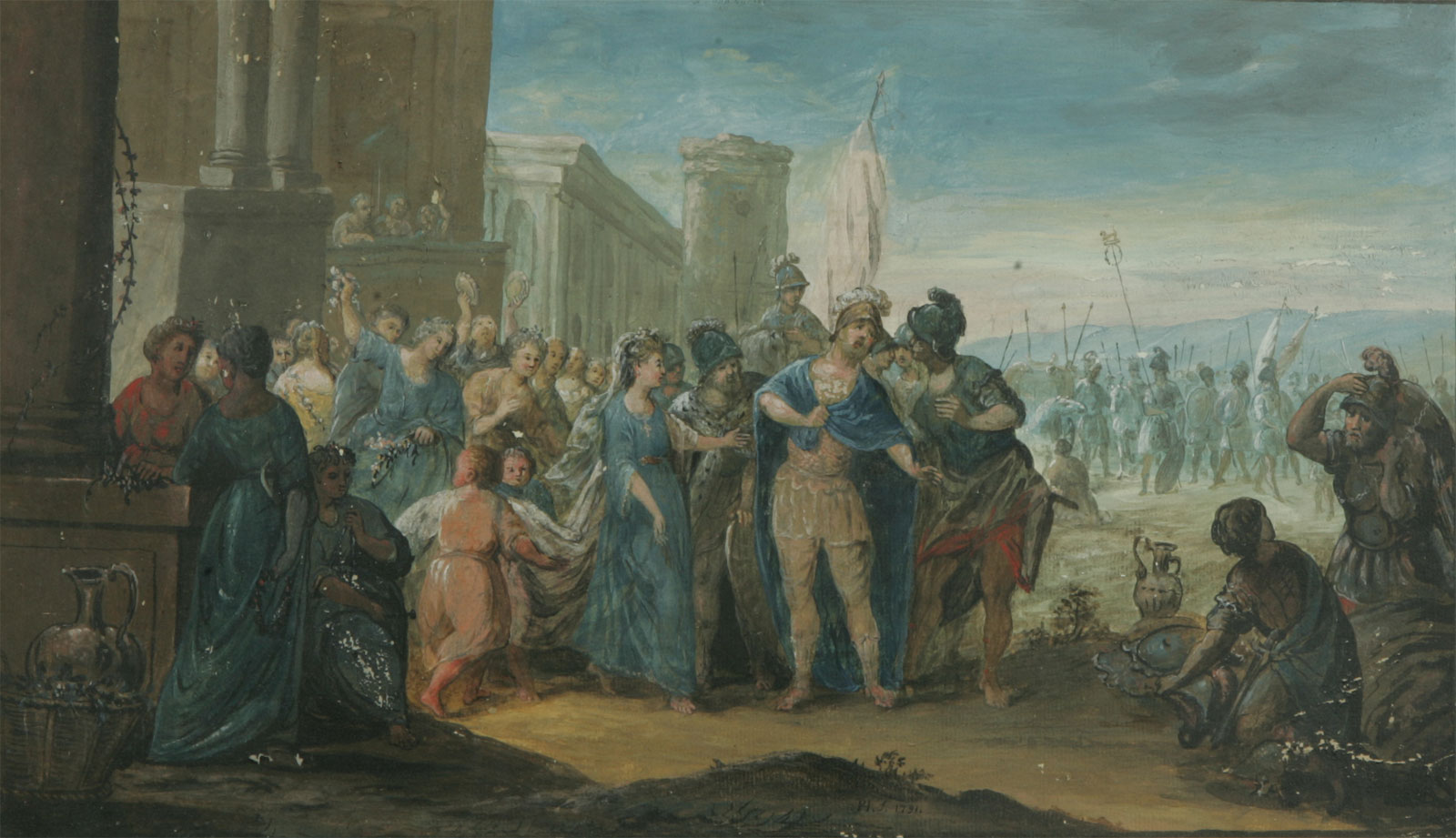
Representation of some Roman soldiers in front of the collected loot (gouache by Pehr Hörberg of 1791)

The Greek historian Polybius recounts that in the Roman era there existed a particular regulation concerning war booty after having conquered a city. Depending on the size of the city, the Romans assigned to the collection of booty, in some cases some men taken from each maniple, while at other times entire maniples. They never, however, employed for this operation more than half of their troops. The others were arranged to control the key points of the city, both internally and externally, always ready to intervene at any moment.

It should be added that in the republican period, since consular armies were normally composed of two legions and two alae of allied troops, all those who were assigned to this action of plundering normally brought the share of booty they had taken to their own legion.

The tribunes, once the entire booty had been sold, distributed the profit in equal parts to everyone, including those who had remained at their post performing a covering function, in addition to those placed to guard the camps, the sick, and also those who had been sent somewhere to perform some special duty but belonging to that particular consular army. All this because no one may appropriate part of the booty without having been authorized by his tribune. All, in fact, must remain faithful to the oath taken at the moment of entering the army, when the recruits are assembled for the first time in the camp, in preparation for their first military campaigns.

Comrades-in-arms trusted each other, according to Polybius, because everyone knew — both those who remained on cover duty and those who went to plunder the city — that each would be given his share without anyone ever considering it appropriate to abandon his post in order to recover his portion of the booty, something that would have caused irreparable damage in an army.

It is said that Julius Caesar, not only did not remove from his soldiers during the Gallic Wars the possibility of taking booty, but to the poor and simple legionary, who had to keep clearly in mind the final objective of the campaign and whose actions were not to condition the operational plans of the commander, in 51–50 BC he doubled the pay from 5 to 10 asses per day (equal to 225 denarii annually), so much so that the pay of the legionary remained unchanged until the period of the emperor Domitian (81–96).

It is said that the conquest of Dacia brought to the emperor Trajan an enormous booty, estimated at five million Roman pounds of gold (equal to 163.6 t) and double the amount of silver, and an 'extraordinary' quantity of other loot, in addition to half a million prisoners of war with their weapons. It was the treasure of Decebalus, which the king himself is said to have hidden in the bed of a small river (the Sargetia) near his capital, Sarmizegetusa Regia. The same emperor was granted a grand triumph, with gladiatorial spectacles, chariot races in the Circus Maximus, a new forum and the construction of the famous column, thirty meters high, on whose spiral frieze, two hundred meters long, the military deeds of Trajan and his generals were carved. A work of rare beauty and originality where, under the guidance of the architect Apollodorus of Damascus, until the day of the inauguration (which took place on May 12 113), numerous sculptors worked on 155 scenes and 2500 figures. Some have thought that these figures are the result of a transcription error and should be divided by 10, but the adjusted figures remain significant. In fact Trajan seems to have received from this immense booty about 2.7 billion sesterces, a figure clearly higher than the entire sum spent by Augustus and documented in his Res gestae divi Augusti. In addition to this, the conquest contributed to a permanent increase in revenues in the state treasury thanks to the mines of western Dacia which were reopened under the supervision of imperial officials.

Looting was sometimes prohibited due to religious concerns. For example, King Clovis I of the Franks, forbade his soldiers to loot when they campaigned near St Martin's shrine in Tours, for fear of offending the saint. In warfare in ancient times, the spoils of war included the defeated populations, which were often enslaved. Women and children might become absorbed into the victorious country's population, as concubines, eunuchs and slaves. In other pre-modern societies, objects made of precious metals were the preferred target of war looting, largely because of their ease of portability. In many cases, looting offered an opportunity to obtain treasures and works of art that otherwise would not have been obtainable. Beginning in the early modern period and reaching its peak in the New Imperialism era, European colonial powers frequently looted areas they captured during military campaigns against non-European states. In the 1930s, and even more so during the Second World War, Nazi Germany engaged in large-scale and organized looting of art and property, particularly in Nazi-occupied Poland. The Soviet Union did likewise. On the smaller level, looting was done by other Allied forces too.

Looting, combined with poor military discipline, has occasionally been an army's downfall since troops who have dispersed to ransack an area may become vulnerable to counter-attack, a good example being during the 1967 First Invasion of Onitsha, where the victorious Nigerian troops were encircled and annihilated while looting. In other cases, for example, the Wahhabi sack of Karbala in 1801 or 1802, loot has contributed to further victories for an army. Not all looters in wartime are conquerors; the looting of Vistula Land by the retreating Imperial Russian Army in 1915 was among the factors sapping the loyalty of Poles to Russia. Local civilians can also take advantage of a breakdown of order to loot public and private property, as took place at the Iraq Museum in the course of the Iraq War in 2003. Lev Nikolayevich Tolstoy's novel War and Peace describes widespread looting by Moscow's citizens before Napoleon's troops entered the city in 1812, along with looting by French troops elsewhere.

In 1990 and 1991, during the Gulf War, Saddam Hussein's soldiers caused significant damage to both Kuwaiti and Saudi infrastructure. They also stole from private companies and homes. In April 2003, looters broke into the National Museum of Iraq, and thousands of artefacts remain missing.

Syrian conservation sites and museums were looted during the Syrian Civil War, with items being sold on the international black market. Reports from 2012 suggested that the antiquities were being traded for weapons by the various combatants.

==== Prohibition under international law ====
Both customary international law and international treaties prohibit pillage in armed conflict. The Lieber Code, the Brussels Declaration (1874), and the Oxford Manual have recognized the prohibition against pillage. The Hague Conventions of 1899 and 1907 (modified in 1954) obliges military forces not only to avoid the destruction of enemy property but also to provide for its protection. Article 8 of the Statute of the International Criminal Court provides that in international warfare, "pillaging a town or place, even when taken by assault", is a war crime. In the aftermath of World War II, a number of war criminals were prosecuted for pillage. The International Criminal Tribunal for the Former Yugoslavia (1993–2017) brought several prosecutions for pillage.

The Fourth Geneva Convention of 1949 explicitly prohibits the looting of civilian property during wartime.

Theoretically, to prevent such looting, unclaimed property is moved to the custody of the Custodian of Enemy Property, to be handled until returned to its owners.

The International Criminal Court has prosecuted acts of pillage and looting as war crimes, including during conflicts in the Democratic Republic of Congo.

==== Modern conflicts ====
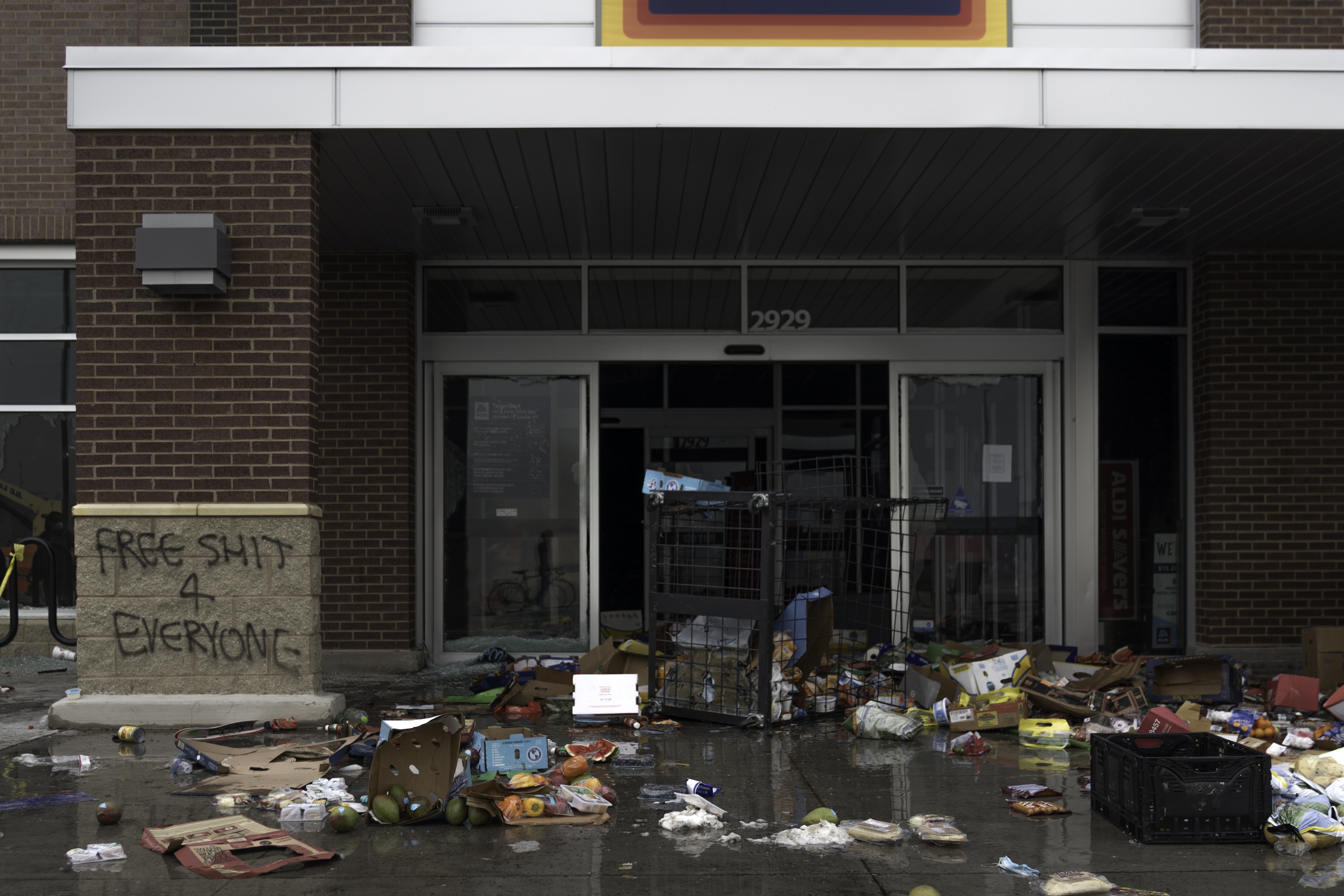
Vandalized and looted Aldi store during the George Floyd protests in Minneapolis, 28 May 2020

Despite international prohibitions against the practice of looting, the ease with which it can be done means that it remains relatively common, particularly during outbreaks of civil unrest during which rules of war may not yet apply. The 2011 Egyptian Revolution, for example, caused a significant increase in the looting of antiquities from archaeological sites in Egypt, as the government lost the ability to protect the sites. Other acts of modern looting, such as the looting and destruction of artifacts from the National Museum of Iraq by Islamic State militants, can be used as an easy way to express contempt for the concept of rules of war altogether.

In the case of a sudden change in a country or region's government, it can be difficult to determine what constitutes looting as opposed to a new government taking custody of the property in question. This can be especially difficult if the new government is only partially recognized at the time the property is moved, as was the case during the 2021 Taliban offensive, during which a number of artifacts and a large amount of property of former government officials who had fled the country fell into the hands of the Taliban before they were recognized as the legitimate government of Afghanistan by other countries. Further looting and burning of civilian homes and villages has been defended by the Taliban as within their right as the legitimate government of Afghanistan.

Masked people carrying looted goods during protests and riots in Paris on 17 October 2026

Looting can also be common in cases where civil unrest is contained largely within the borders of a country or during peacetime. Riots in the wake of the 2020 George Floyd protests in numerous American cities led to increased amounts of looting, as looters took advantage of the delicate political situation and civil unrest surrounding the riots themselves. Up to 175 Target stores closed nationwide during the disturbances.

During the ongoing Kashmir conflict, looting of Kashmiris trapped between the Indian and Pakistani militarized zones is common and widespread.

In 2022, international observers accused Russia of engaging in large scale looting during the Russo-Ukrainian War, reporting the widespread looting of everything from food to industrial equipment. Despite the publication of numerous photos and videos by Ukrainian journalists and civilians, numerous Russian commanders have denied these claims. International observers have theorized that this looting is either the result of direct orders, despite to Russia's claims to the contrary, or due to Russian soldiers not being issued with adequate food and other resources by their commanders. On 18 November 2022, the University of Miami estimated that Russian forces in Ukraine had destroyed, pillaged, and looted at least 40 museums in Ukraine.

Israeli soldiers testified to Haaretz in 2026 that IDF reservists were looting civilian property on a large scale in southern Lebanon during the Hezbollah-Israel conflict, openly bringing items back into Israel including motorcycles and sofas. Although officially prohibited, border checkpoints of the military police were often removed. Similar testimony was reported in 2025 by Breaking the Silence regarding the same phenomenon in Gaza during the Israel-Gaza war which similarly was effectively ignored by the military police. Another Haaretz article pointed out that looting was common throughout Israel's conflicts since the state's founding.

== Archaeological removals ==
The term "looting" is also sometimes used to refer to antiquities being removed from countries by unauthorized people, either domestic people breaking the law seeking monetary gain or foreign nations, which are usually more interested in prestige or previously, "scientific discovery". An example might be the removal of the contents of Egyptian tombs that were transported to museums across the West.

== Looting of industry ==
As part of World War II reparations, Soviet forces systematically plundered the Soviet occupation zone of Germany, including the Recovered Territories, which later transferred to Poland. The Soviets sent valuable industrial equipment, infrastructure and whole factories to the Soviet Union.

Many factories in the rebels' zone of Aleppo during the Syrian Civil War were reported as being plundered and their assets transferred abroad. Agricultural products and electronic power plants were also seized, to be sold elsewhere.

== Gallery ==
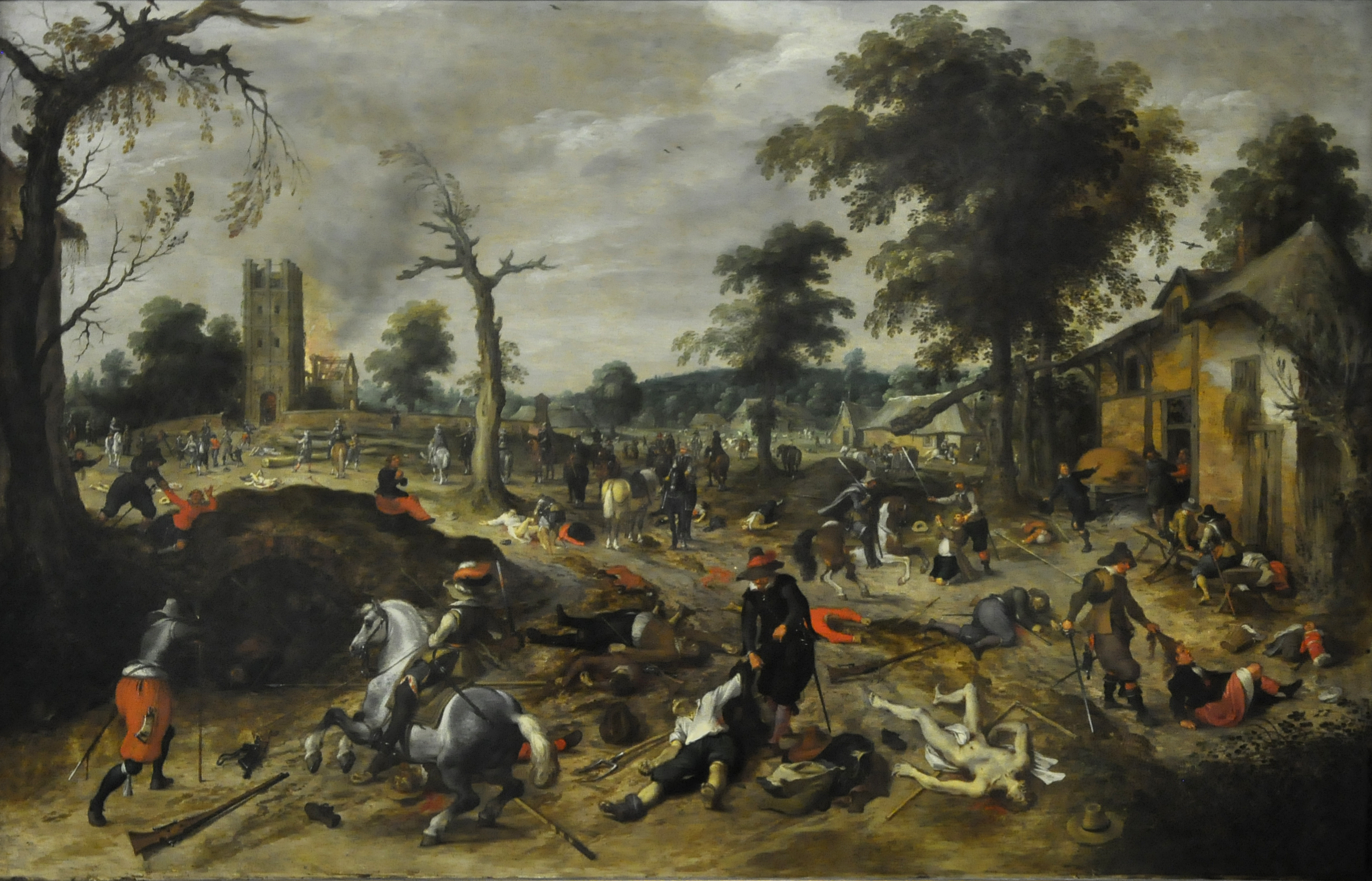
The aftermath of the plundering of the village of Wommelgem in 1589. Eighty Years' War, painting by Sebastiaen Vrancx

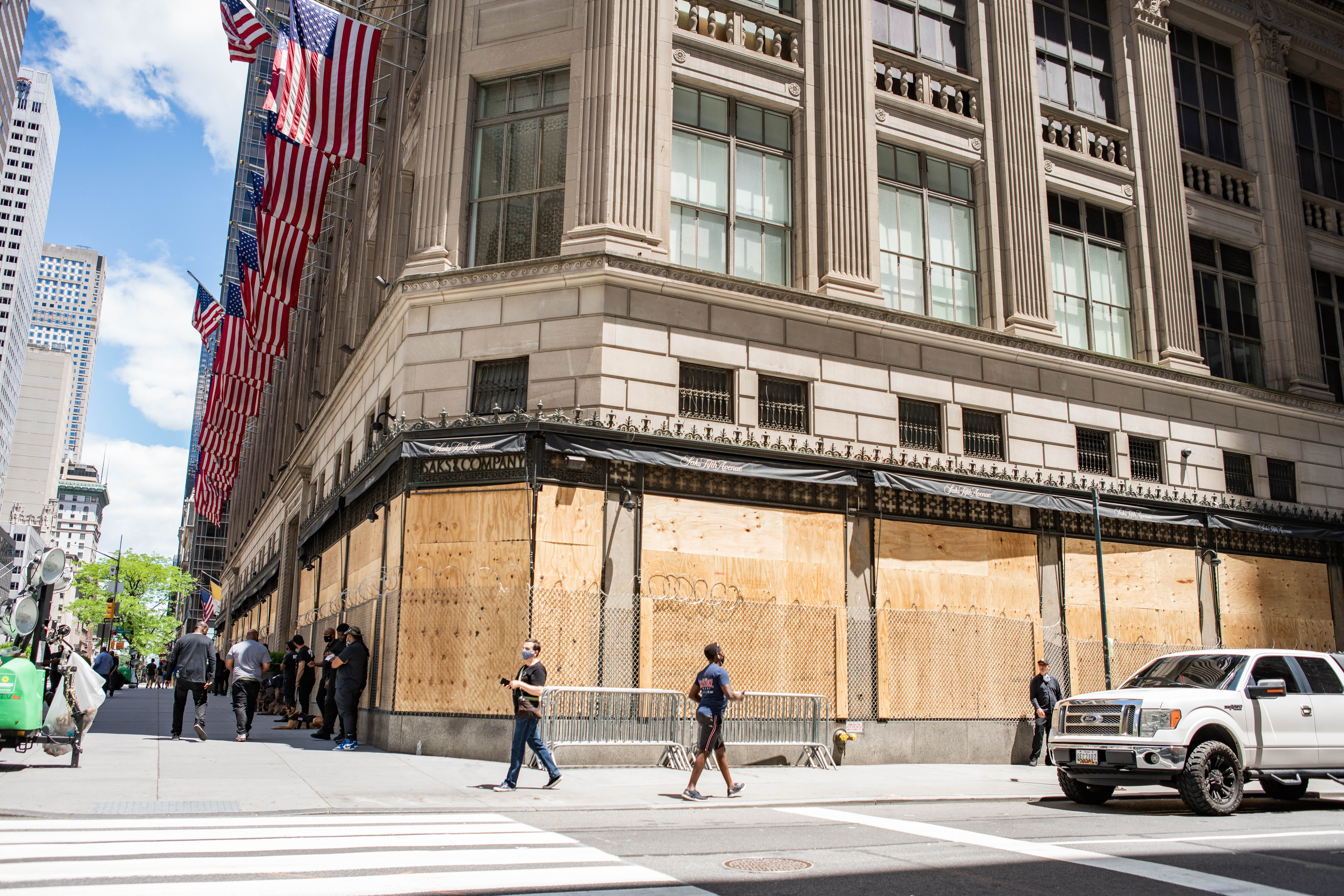
Private security guards, barbed wire fencing, and boarded up windows to prevent looting of department stores in New York City during mass unrest in the United States, 7 June 2020

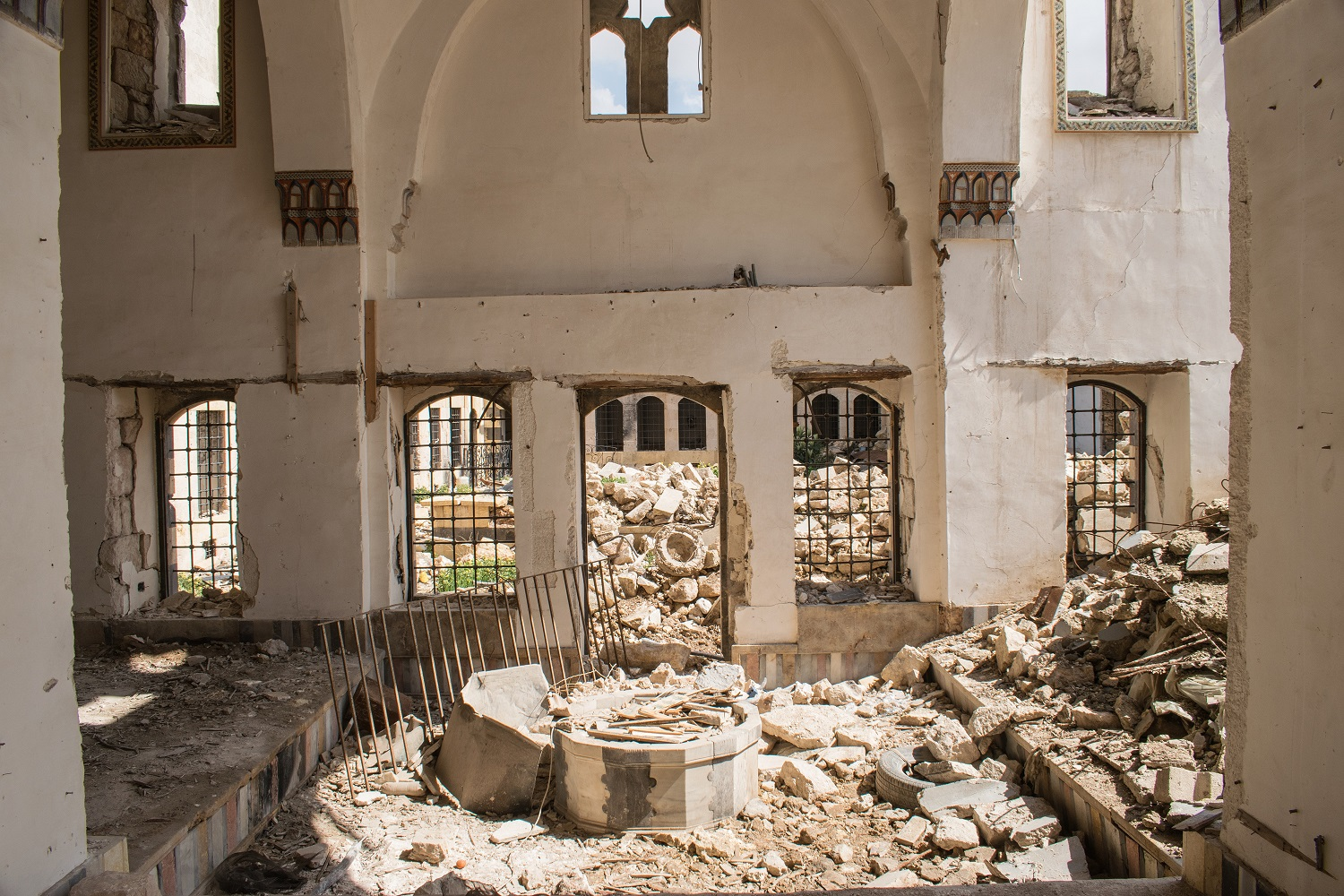
The Beit Ghazaleh Museum of Aleppo was looted of its contents prior to being hit by explosions (photo 2017)

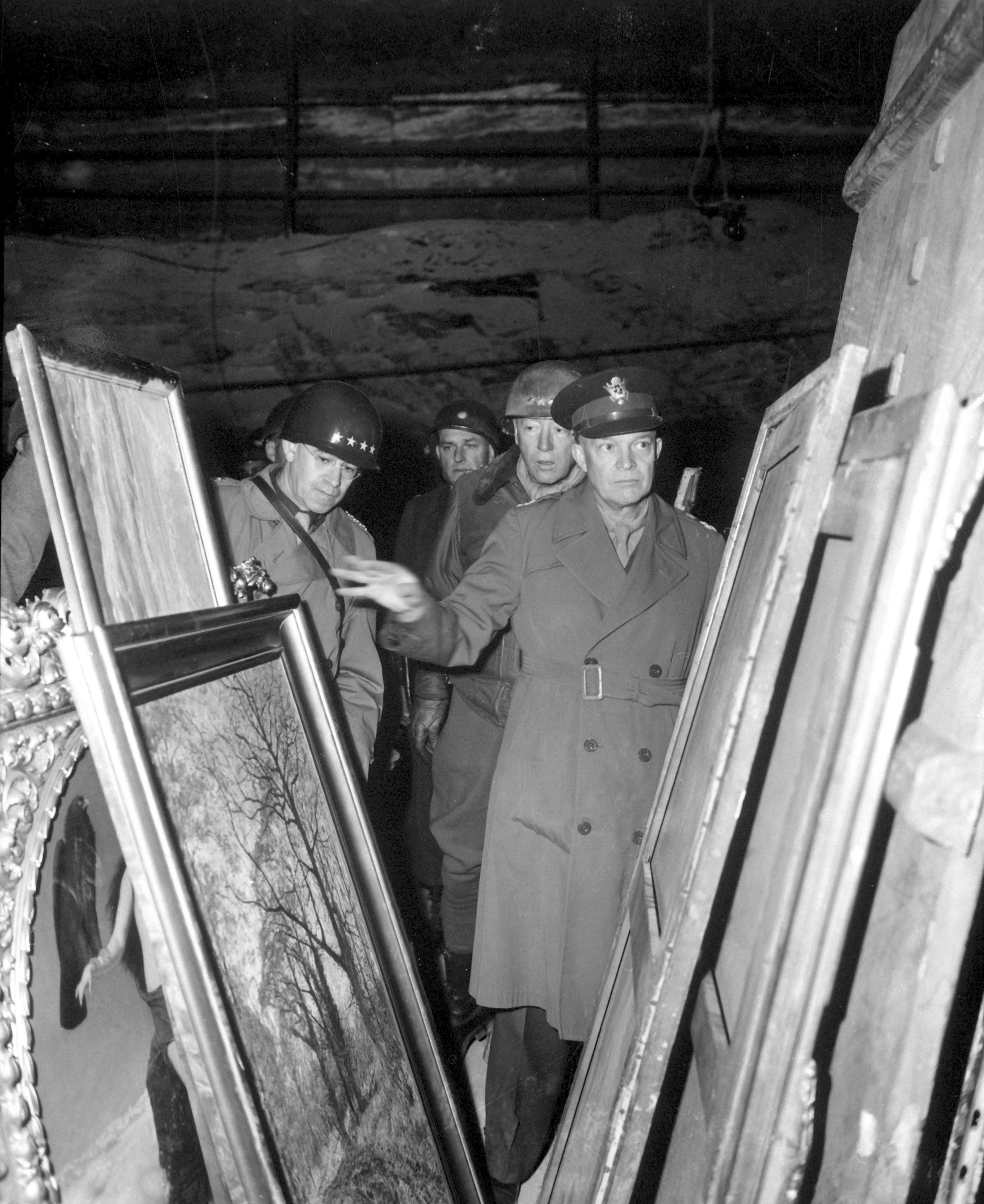
General Dwight D. Eisenhower, Gen. Omar N. Bradley, and Lt. Gen. George S. Patton Jr., inspect art treasures stolen by Germans and hidden in salt mine in Germany (1945)

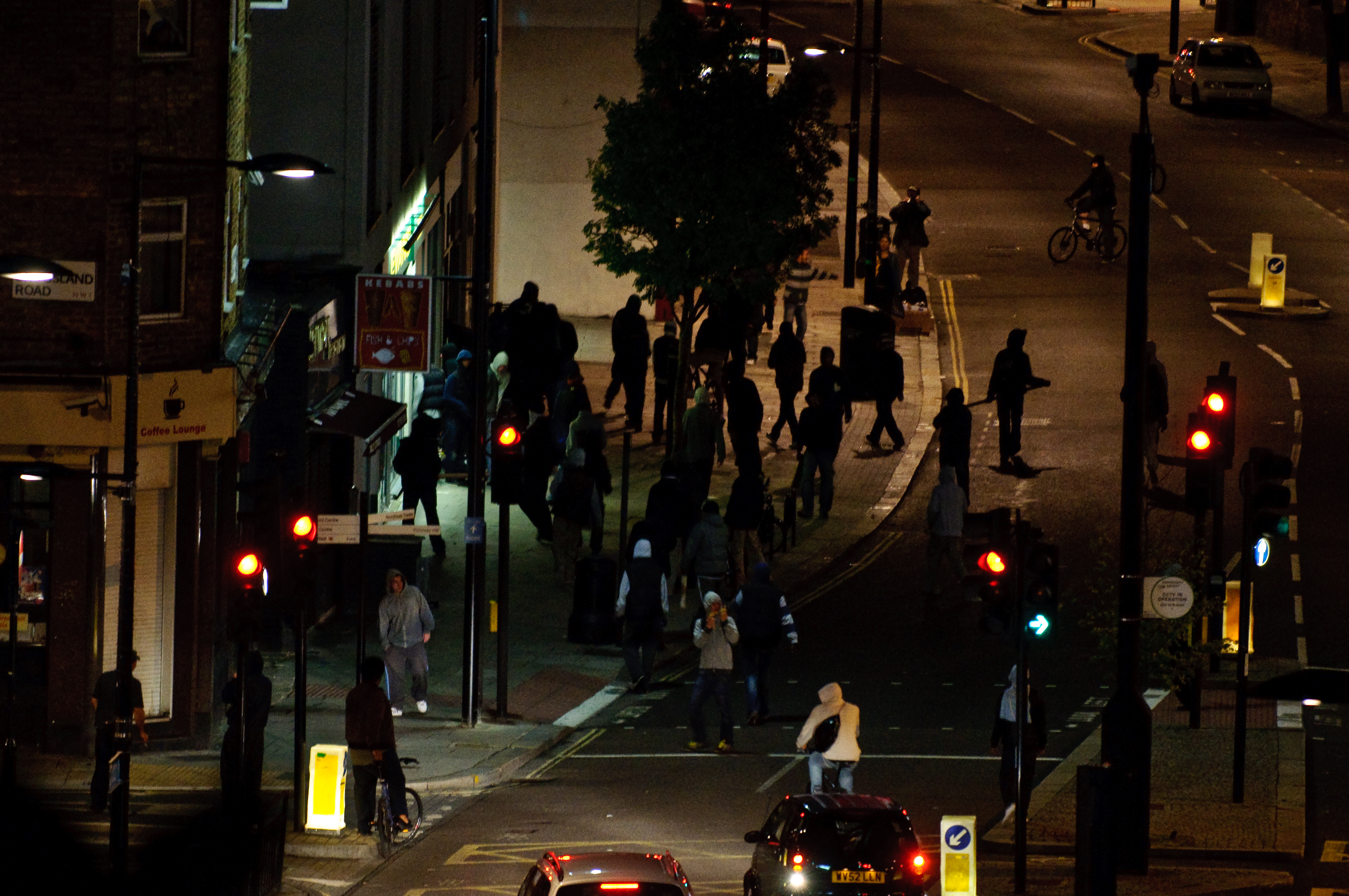
Looters attempting to enter a cycle shop in North London during the 2011 England riots

== See also ==
- Arson
- Banditry
- Cattle raiding
- Conflict resource
- Piracy
- Prize of war
- Spolia opima, armour and arms a Roman general stripped from the body of an opposing commander slain in single combat
- Slave raiding
- Spoils system
- Vandalism
- Thak Thak gang
