= Chee and T =

- Directed by: Tanuj Chopra
- Screenplay by: Tanuj Chopra; Chee Malabar
- Produced by: Sarah Craig; Griffin Gmelich; Sohini Sengupta
- Starring: Sunkrish Bala; Dominic Rains
- Cinematography: Smokey Nelson
- Edited by: Karim López
- Production company: Chops Films
- Distributed by: Comedy Dynamics
- Release date: June 2, 2016 (Los Angeles)
- Running time: 80 minutes
- Country: United States
- Language: English

Chee and T is a 2016 American comedy film written and directed by Tanuj Chopra and starring Sunkrish Bala and Dominic Rains.

== Cast ==
- Karan Soni as Roger Raval
- Noureen DeWulf as Shana
- Dominic Rains as T
- Rebecca Hazlewood as Monie
- Asif Ali as Mayunk
- Bernard White as Uncle Rob
- Lynn Chen as Lindo Chong
- Sunkrish Bala as Chee

== Release ==
The film made its world premiere on June 2, 2016 at the LA Film Festival.

=== Accolades ===
The film won the Special Jury Prize for Comedy at the LA Film Festival and the Best Narrative Feature Award at the San Diego Asian Film Festival.
