= Delhi Crime =

2019 Indian drama anthology series

- Genre: Crime drama; Police procedural
- Created by: Richie Mehta
- Directed by: Richie Mehta; Tanuj Chopra
- Starring: Shefali Shah; Rasika Dugal; Adil Hussain; Rajesh Tailang
- Composers: Andrew Lockington – series 1 Ceiri Torjussen – series 2 and 3
- Country of origin: India
- Original languages: Hindi; English
- No. of seasons: 3
- No. of episodes: 18

Production
- Executive producers: Aaron Kaplan; Jeff Sagansky; Florence Sloan; Apoorva Bakshi; Pooja Kohli; Sanjay Bachani; John Penotti; Kilian Kerwin; Michael Hogan
- Production location: India
- Cinematography: Johan Heurlin Aidt; David Bolen
- Editor: Beverly Mills
- Camera setup: Single-camera
- Running time: 36–64 minutes
- Production companies: Golden Karavan; Ivanhoe Productions; FilmKaravan; Poor Man's Productions

Original release
- Network: Netflix
- Release: 22 March 2019 – present

Delhi Crime is an Indian police procedural crime drama television series written and directed by Richie Mehta. With creative manager Chirag Shah and produced by Golden Karaven, Ivanhoe Productions, Film Karavan and Poor Man's Productions, the series stars Shefali Shah, Rasika Dugal, Adil Hussain and Rajesh Tailang. The first season is set in the aftermath of the 2012 Delhi gang rape. The second season focuses on the Chaddi Baniyan Gang. The third season focuses on human trafficking and is inspired by the 2012 Baby Falak case.

Filming for the first season began in Delhi in January 2018, and was completed within 62 days. The series covers the period from the incident happening to the final arrest of the suspects.

Delhi Crime's first two episodes premiered at the 2019 Sundance Film Festival in the Indie Episodic category. The series was released on Netflix on 22 March 2019. It received critical acclaim, with praise for its performances, writing, and depiction of the real-life case that inspired it. At the International Emmy Awards held in November 2020, Delhi Crime became the first Indian series to receive the award for Best Drama Series. The show was renewed for a second season with the main cast returning. The second season premiered on 26 August 2022. It earned Shah a nomination for the International Emmy Award for Best Actress. The third season premiered on 13 November 2025.

== Synopsis ==
Season 1 of Delhi Crime is based on the 2012 Delhi gang rape case that occurred in the neighbourhood of Munirka, South Delhi. The season depicts the events following the incident, in which Deputy Commissioner of Police (DCP) Vartika Chaturvedi leads the investigation to identify and apprehend those responsible for the assault and the victim's subsequent death.

The second season focuses on crimes committed by the Chaddi Baniyan Gang.

The third season follows Vartika Chaturvedi and her team as they investigate multiple interconnected cases involving international sex trafficking and organised crime.

== Cast ==
=== Main ===
- Shefali Shah as DCP/DIG Vartika Chaturvedi IPS (initially based on former DCP of Delhi, Chhaya Sharma; season 1)
- Rajesh Tailang as Inspector Bhupendra Singh
- Rasika Dugal as ACP Neeti Singh IPS (season 2 and 3)
- Adil Hussain as Kumar Vijay (CP) (season 1 and 2)
- Denzil Smith as ADDL. CP Vishal Chaturvedi, Vartika's husband
- Yashaswini Dayama as Chandni "Chandu" Chaturvedi, Vartika and Vishal's daughter
- Tillotama Shome as Lata Solanki/Karishma (season 2)
- Huma Qureshi as Meena Choudhary /Badi Didi (season 3)
- Sayani Gupta (Season 3) as Kusum
- Anurag Arora as Sub-Inspector Jairaj Singh
- Gopal Datt as Sudhir Kumar
- Sidharth Bhardwaj as SHO Shubhash Gupta
- Jaya Bhattacharya as Sub-Inspector Vimla Bharadwaj
- Suman Patel as Shabnam (season 3)
- Aakash Dahiya as Devinder, Neeti's ex-husband
- Yukti Thareja as ASI Simran Masih (season 3)
- Anshumaan Pushkar as Rahul/Amjad (season 3)
- Mita Vashisht as Kalyani Devi (season 3)
- Kelly Dorji as John Gupta (season 3)

=== Recurring ===
- Abhilasha Singh as Deepika, the victim of a brutal gang rape and murder (based on Jyoti Singh/Nirbhaya; season 1)
- Sanjay Bishnoi as Akash Kumar, Deepika's friend who was also a victim of the attack (based on Awindra Pratap Pandey; season 1)
- Vinod Sharawat as SHO Vinod Tiwari
- Avijit Dutt as Home Minister Gururaj Dixit
- Kuldeep Sareen as Inspector Viren Chaddha (season 2)
- Swati Bhatia as Ira
- Mridul Sharma as Jai Singh (partially based on Ram Singh, Mukesh Singh and Mohammed Afroz)
- Ayush Sehgal as Arunesh
- Rhea Bedi as Smriti
- Gaurav Rana as SHO Rakesh Verma
- Govind Singh as Amar Singh
- Vipin Katyal as Arif
- Ashok Mehta as Lead Protester
- Danish Husain as Advocate Vineet Singh (Season 2)
- Jatin Goswami (Season 2)
- Vyom Yadav (Season 2)
- Ankit Sharma (Season 2)
- Aditi Subedi (Season 3) as Khushi
- Mehul Kajaria as Manik Bhimani

== Episodes ==
Season	Episodes	Originally released
1	7	March 22, 2019
2	5	August 26, 2022
3	6	November 13, 2025

=== Season 1 ===
No. overall	No. in season	Title	Directed by	Written by	Original release date
1	1	"Episode 1"	Richie Mehta	Richie Mehta	22 March 2019
Two victims of a brutal crime are found naked in a ditch near the overpass, having been attacked on a city bus in Munirka. The man, Akash Kumar, was beaten, while his friend, Deepika, was raped and tortured with an iron rod, reportedly by six men including the driver and conductor. Delhi DCP Vartika Chaturvedi takes the crime personally and decides to handle the case herself. She enlists her most trusted officers within the otherwise bureaucratic and inefficient department, including Neeti Singh, a young and ambitious trainee. Vartika has her men sweep the city for white metro buses matching the description from the scene; Akash additionally describes there being a Shiva statue on the driver's dashboard. Two officers let one bus driver go after realising he drives a school bus, failing to notice the Shiva statue on his dashboard.
2	2	"Episode 2"	Richie Mehta	Richie Mehta	22 March 2019
As the leads come in, the investigating team focuses on the bus in which the crime was committed. When they find the bus they have their first perpetrator of the crime. Media leaks trigger backlash against police.
3	3	"Episode 3"	Richie Mehta	Richie Mehta	22 March 2019
The team finds blood in the bus. The bus driver Jai Singh confesses to the crime and gives gory details of the assault. Another team goes to Mehrauli to find Jai Singh's brother. They catch Vikas and Brajesh through the suspects' neighbour and Amar from Rajasthan through his other brother.
4	4	"Episode 4"	Richie Mehta	Richie Mehta	22 March 2019
The team now knows the possible whereabouts of Alok, the fifth perpetrator, in Aurangabad, Bihar. Meanwhile, the high court takes up the public interest litigation on the crime as public protests continue. The sixth suspect is still elusive and hunt for his capture intensifies.
5	5	"Episode 5"	Richie Mehta	Richie Mehta	22 March 2019
The condition of the victim is not good. The DCP is facing public and media wrath as well as political fall out. A team sent to Naxalite-infested area reaches the home of Alok. The state's CM demands the resignation of Police Commissioner Vijay. The sixth suspect Sonu is still absconding.
6	6	"Episode 6"	Richie Mehta	Richie Mehta	22 March 2019
The police safeguard culprits from public anger. Two suspects attempt suicide inside their prison cell. The team gone to Bihar travels to Jharkhand to the home of Alok's in-laws. The search for Sonu escalates. Male victim Akash is planning to appear on TV. Vartika advises him to avoid media at that stage of investigation. Meanwhile, Sonu is spotted in a bus going to Gurgaon.
7	7	"Episode 7"	Richie Mehta	Richie Mehta	22 March 2019
Sonu is caught at the bus stand. He turns out to be a minor. As the public protest turns violent, the PC orders lathi charge. The victim records her official statement in presence of a magistrate. Alok is apprehended from his home in Bihar. The government orders a judicial enquiry into the conduct of police. Vartika is informed that Jai Singh has committed suicide in jail.

=== Season 2 ===
No. overall	No. in season	Title	Directed by	Written by	Original release date
8	1	"Episode 1"	Tanuj Chopra	Mayank Tewari, Shubhra Swarup and Ensia Mirza	26 August 2022
When everything seems fine, Neena and DCP South district are left shocked when a new case about senior citizens enters the climax.
9	2	"Episode 2"	Tanuj Chopra	Vidit Tripathi and Ensia Mirza	26 August 2022
The Commissioner suggests Vartika call inspector Viren Chaddha after another murder shocks Delhi Police. Someone leaks the details to the press and Vartika, suspecting an insider's job, orders to probe the issue.
10	3	"Episode 3"	Tanuj Chopra	Shubhra Swarup and Ensia Mirza⁣	26 August 2022
The team's investigation of two suspects leads to eye-opening findings. Amid pressure to appease the media and the public, Vartika faces a moral dilemma. She lets go of the two suspects as they are not guilty. The true killers are preparing for a new set of murders but call off the plan after observing a kid in the mix.
11	4	"Episode 4"	Tanuj Chopra	Mayank Tewari and Ensia Mirza	26 August 2022
Against a ticking clock, Vartika takes the case in a new direction. Neeti finds a common link among the murders. Another tip-off leads to a suspect.
12	5	"Episode 5"	Tanuj Chopra	Shubhra Swarup and Mayank Tewari	26 August 2022
The team finds the suspects' hideout. But with Lata still missing, Vartika must determine if she's running or hiding - and finally uncover her story.

=== Season 3 ===
No. overall	No. in season	Title	Directed by	Written by	Original release date
13	1	"Episode 1"	Tanuj Chopra	Apoorva Bakshi, Tanuj Chopra, Anu Singh Choudhary, Michael Hogan, Shubhra Swarup, Mayank Tewari	13 November 2025
Vartika Chaturvedi has been transferred to Assam after her previous case. While attempting to intercept an arms shipment in Silchar, she and her team stop a truck full of women who are being trafficked to New Delhi from Mizoram. After a shootout, the driver is captured and interrogated. He reveals that another truck full of women is already en route to Delhi. Even though her superiors disapprove, Vartika travels to New Delhi and works with Bhupendra Singh and her old team, but the women have already been moved from Azadpur Market by a van belonging to Swift Wings Travels. "Badi Didi" tells her subordinate Vijay to take an unwilling bride away from an arranged marriage to a "hostel". Neeti Singh is getting divorced, and Vimla calls her into the case of Noor, a severely injured 2 year old child who was abandoned at AIIMS by Khushi. Rahul, the driver for the trafficking operation, attempts to restrain Khushi, but he flees from the police while she is apprehended. Kalyani and Kusum train women to be escorts, instructing them in dressing, makeup, and conversation. Badi Didi takes 3 women to John Gupta in Thailand, who chooses 2 of them.
14	2	"Episode 2"	Tanuj Chopra	Apoorva Bakshi, Tanuj Chopra, Anu Singh Choudhary, Michael Hogan, Shubhra Swarup, Mayank Tewari	13 November 2025
Vartika flashes back to her first ever brothel raid while talking to her daughter. Neeti's divorce is finalised. Noor is in the ICU after brain surgery, and Khushi is uncooperative during interrogation by Vimla. Badi Didi agrees to supply Gupta with 40 more women within a week. The travel agency's records show that the van was rented by Rahul under an alias. He tries to flee to Kathmandu after seeing Neeti's press conference, but is foiled by police roadblocks. Badi Didi moves the women to Rohtak, where Kalyani talks about bribing the police to ignore their operation. Khushi tells Vartika that Noor was given to her husband Rahul by Kalyani, her former pimp. She accepts responsibility for injuring Noor, and reveals Kalyani's location in Uttam Nagar. Neeti arrests Kalyani, and Rahul is arrested from the home of Safia after she gave him up to the police. Both of their interrogations are unproductive, and Badi Didi provides Awasthi, a lawyer, to represent Kalyani. She is remanded to custody for 3 days after Vartika details the cases and the trafficking ring to a judge, but she is killed by men on a motorcycle outside the Sessions Court.
15	3	"Episode 3"	Tanuj Chopra	Apoorva Bakshi, Tanuj Chopra, Anu Singh Choudhary, Michael Hogan, Shubhra Swarup, Mayank Tewari	13 November 2025
Badi Didi is Meena Choudhary, a former child bride who uses her abusive late husband's farmhouse in Rohtak to run her operation, which is fronted by a marriage bureau. Rahul reveals that Khushi is 14 years old, and was sold by her own family. He took Shabnam Bano, Noor's mother, to the farmhouse. Neeti and ASI Simran raid it and find records of trafficked women. Noor declines and Khushi is taken to an NGO. Meena has to procure 10 women from Khanna, but has to repay a loan taken from "Bhai Ji". The hitman who killed Kalyani demands more money from Vijay. A tip from Simran's informant Sukhdev helps Neeti find Aradhana who was trafficked from Jharkhand. She identifies Meena, Kusum, and Vijay, reveals the location of a brothel, and declines to be rescued. Vartika's informant "London" locates the shooters, but they are killed by Vijay just before the police apprehend them. He escapes Bhupendra and moves the remaining women to a safehouse in Surat. Neeti and Simran raid the brothel and capture Kusum, who reveals that Shabnam was sent to Jhunjhunu and married to Tejpal Singh. One of the women sent to Gupta is dead.
16	4	"Episode 4"	Tanuj Chopra	Apoorva Bakshi, Tanuj Chopra, Anu Singh Choudhary, Michael Hogan, Shubhra Swarup, Mayank Tewari	13 November 2025
Vijay crosses into Gujarat at Banswara, and transfers the women to a bus. Meena and Awasthi bail out Kusum, who follows Vijay to Surat. Vartika and Neeti converge in Jhunjhunu, but Shabnam has already fled. Meena is followed on her way back to Delhi. Vartika finds Shabnam on a bus and takes her into custody. She says that Kalyani lured her from Madhepura to Delhi, gave away her 3 children, including Sana (Noor), and married her off through Meena even though she had been sterilised. She is harassed by the press when she goes to see Sana. Neeti parts with her ex-husband on good terms. Vartika's superiors are pressing her for updates, and her husband Vishal says that she needs to trust and delegate tasks to others. Khushi is not fitting in at the remand home. Simran tracks a vehicle seen at the brothel to Meena's house, where she is subdued by the valet. London cannot find Vijay in any military records, but says that Mithul Khanna, an elite trafficker from Kolkata, has arrived at the Connaught Crown hotel in Delhi. Bhupendra searches his room while Vartika finds Meena collapsed at the hotel's restaurant due to low blood sugar.
17	5	"Episode 5"	Tanuj Chopra	Apoorva Bakshi, Tanuj Chopra, Anu Singh Choudhary, Michael Hogan, Shubhra Swarup, Mayank Tewari	13 November 2025
Khanna has fled the hotel after being tipped off about the police. Meena pulls the fire alarm and escapes in the chaos before Vartika realizes who she is, and travels to Surat where Kusum is training the women. Neeti returns to Rohtak to find Simran, who has been captured by Meena's goons. Vimla and Jairaj find Sania, Shabnam's older daughter, at the Muzzafarpur railway station in the hands of the beggar gang that purchased her from Deepa, Kalyani's daughter. Subhash and Sudhir track down Shabnam's son Sameer at the home of Babbu, and both children are reunited with their mother. Gupta is pressing for delivery within 72 hours, and selects Sonam for himself. Meena and Vijay go to Jahangirpura to drop off a part of Bhai Ji's payment with Bhimani, but kill him when he threatens them for the rest. This allows Vartika and Bhupendra to pick up their trail in Surat. Neeti finds Simran at Meena's house and apprehends a goon whose phone is used to track Vijay to Palsana Village. Meena and Kusum escape with the women while Vijay engages Vartika's team in a shootout. He is shot by Bhupendra and drops his phone before escaping on foot.
18	6	"Episode 6"	Tanuj Chopra	Apoorva Bakshi, Tanuj Chopra, Anu Singh Choudhary, Michael Hogan, Shubhra Swarup, Mayank Tewari	13 November 2025
Meena and Kusum move the women to the Panvel Container Yard outside Mumbai while Vijay follows them on a truck. Sana passes away after a third cardiac arrest. Vartika defends Shabnam and Khushi before the press, and comforts Neeti, who was considering adoption. Sonam stops Meena from choking a sick woman. Vartika convinces her superiors against handing the case to the CBI. Meena is tracked by Ashutosh when she calls Vijay, and Vartika's team goes to Mumbai. The women are drugged and loaded into a shipping container. Sonam has not swallowed her pill, and escapes. Kusum is drugged and put in the container in her place. Vijay arrives at the yard as the police cordon it off. Vartika and Neeti find Sonam, who describes the container. Jairaj and Neeti find the container, rescue the women, and apprehend Kusum. Vimla kills two goons and forces Meena to retreat into the yard, where Vartika captures her. Meena recounts her life story and justifies her actions before Vijay shoots Vartika. Bhupendra kills Vijay before Vartika recovers and kills Meena. Two months later, Khushi is remanded to a rehabilitation center.

== Production ==
=== Development ===
Mehta decided to write a script based on the events during the 2012 Delhi gang rape and murder incident. He then conceived the idea of Delhi Crime during a conversation with Neeraj Kumar, the former Commissioner of the Delhi Police, who introduced him to the investigating team and provided access to several legal documents that were prepared as part of the investigation. Later on, Kumar asked Mehta if he would consider making a film on the case to which he denied. He then started reading the documents and was "amazed at the precision with which this case was solved, and so quickly." He also met the officers involved in the case and was "blown away by them." Mehta also sought permission from the victim's family. He said that films like The French Connection (1971) and Zodiac (2007) influenced his approach.

He modeled several portrayals of the cops based on his own observations. Mehta said that the making of the series was a "personally transformative journey" for him. He spoke to several police personnel involved in the case and tried "retracing the paths that the police took during the course of the investigation." It took Mehta six years to finish his research, adding that the writing part of the film which began in 2014 took place for more than four years, since he had to meet the cops and had to return to Canada to put his research work altogether, which took him more time. Mehta initially wanted to make it as a feature film, but as he continued the research, he realised that he could not fit the content in that length.

=== Casting ===
The casting director of the series is Mukesh Chhabra. Mehta decided to focus on actors from theatre background, without being influenced by the need to have recognised faces from Hindi film industry. Shefali Shah, Rajesh Tailang, Adil Hussain and Rasika Dugal were a part of the prominent cast members in the series, with whom Mehta worked in their first feature film Amal (2007). When Mehta spoke to Chhabra he stated that he had a little time to process the completion, so Mehta did not agree to cast star actors in the series, which unleashed Chhabra's imagination. He also added that the rise of streaming platforms had given much recognition to "some of the best acting talent in the world that comes from India".

The character of Vartika Chaturvedi (Shefali Shah) was based on Chhaya Sharma, the former deputy commissioner of police in Delhi. Mehta met Sharma, who was in the team who caught the perpetrators. They spoke for months as Mehta wanted her point of view in the crime. Shefali Shah agreed to don the character after Mehta's narration spanned for five minutes and also met Sharma for the preparation of the role. Tailang's character was an amalgamation of different investigating officers, but he spoke to one police officer and used him as reference point.

=== Filming ===
The series spans six days, covering the period between 16 December and 21 December 2012, from the incident to the final arrest. The film went on floors in Delhi in January 2018 after taking permission from the Delhi police and the victim's family, and was shot over the course of 62 days. Mehta decided not to show the rape on screen as he wanted "not to cross that line into exploitation." To make the experience more cathartic for the audience, director Richie Mehta revealed that they used handheld cameras on purpose. He says, "We wanted the audience like they are a part of our narrative and all that was happening on the sets. To make them feel more inclusive, we have shot those scenes with a handheld camera."

The shooting commenced in Delhi, mostly on the roads and no sets were used. Neeraj Kumar, for whom Mehta conceived the idea of the script stated that he advised the producers not to involve my successors who would neither approve of the project nor would they give any support, since the case was their predecessor's — a common failing observed in the police. Thus, the entire shoot was done almost without formal permissions.

Before the shoot, Kumar called the entire cast including Shefali Shah, to brief them about police hierarchy, the rank structure, body language of the police and the works so as to find the series to be an authentic depiction of the police on account of these briefings. Kumar has not visited the shooting spot, with the exception of one scene at the India Gate because his visits to the locales would have spread the word that he was getting Delhi Crime being made for his glorification.

== Release ==
The first two episodes of the series was premiered at the 2019 Sundance Film Festival at the Indie Episodic Category, held on 23 January to 3 February 2019. Netflix acquired the streaming rights of the show later, and on 14 February, with the official announcement of their new original contents (including series and films) for their 2019 original slate, the makers confirmed their scheduled release of 22 March 2019. The official trailer of this series was unveiled on 11 March 2019. The show was released on Netflix on 22 March.

Delhi Crime season 2's official trailer was released on 8 August 2022. Delhi Crime Season 2 premiered on 26 August 2022 on Netflix. The entire season, consisting of 5 episodes, was released simultaneously worldwide. It is available in multiple languages, including Hindi, English, Telugu, and Tamil, with subtitles.

== Reception ==
=== Season 1 ===
The first season received universal acclaim upon its release. On Rotten Tomatoes, the series has an approval rating of 92% based on 12 reviews, with an average rating of 7.25/10.

Daniel Fienberg of The Hollywood Reporter called it "consistently different enough to be interesting." He also felt the police-procedural conventions felt "reasonably fresh and consistently engaging." Ben Travers of IndieWire wrote: "An expertly told, hard-to-watch true crime series, Delhi Crime Story won't be for everyone — but it won't let go of anyone who watches." Shubhra Gupta of The Indian Express wrote: "Where Delhi Crime scores is in the portrayal of a beleaguered police force, which is easy to point fingers at."

Saibal Chatterjee of NDTV called the series "grim, gritty and grounded in the everyday." He further wrote: "Delhi Crime is a knockout punch of a series: unsettling and enthralling by turns." Piyasree Dasgupta of HuffPost noted that the series "comes across as such an elaborate exercise to valorise the Delhi Police that it actually seems deeply insensitive." She also said that the "only people the show humanises are the police." Rahul Desai of Film Companion wrote: "It's the tiny infusions of well-informed opinion into what is essentially dramatic long-read reportage that make Delhi Crime one hell of a ride." Rohan Naahar of Hindustan Times called it: " gut-wrenching, stylishly directed, passionately performed, and most important, not at all exploitative." Avinash Ramachandran of The New Indian Express – Cinema Express in his review wrote: "Delhi Crime might be a glorification of the police force, but it is also a mirror to our society. It might absolve the Delhi police of its alleged dereliction of duties, but it is also a reminder that we vouched, and hoped, for a similar incident to never happen again."

Along with the story telling and the premise of the series, the cast also received widespread appreciation for their performances in the series. Priyanka Roy of The Telegraph said: "And while the rest of it is worth a watch, Shefali Shah is reason number one why you shouldn't give Delhi Crime a miss." Nandini Ramnath from Scroll wrote: " Rajesh Tailang, Anurag Arora, Adil Hussain, Jaya Bhattacharya, Gopal Dutt and Vinod Sharawat are among the numerous actors who display the same dedication to their craft as did their fictionalised selves to the investigation." Namrata Joshi from The Hindu said: "Tailang's control, poise and measured way plays out beautifully against Shah's dynamism to give us arguably the best on-screen buddy-cop team seen yet in India."

=== Season 2 ===
The second season of Delhi Crime has an 82% rating based on 11 reviews on Rotten Tomatoes, and has an average audience rating of 7.6/10. It received widespread critical acclaim and, though some reviews noted uneven execution and pacing issues. Reviewers praised its exploration of socio-economic divides, performances (particularly Shefali Shah's), and taut pacing, while critiques included graphic violence and formulaic storytelling..Anuj Kumar of The Hindu called it a "worthwhile experience" that balances "heartfelt performances" with a critique of systemic biases against marginalized communities. He highlighted the series' ability to weave "moral dilemmas" into its narrative without becoming didactic..Abhimanyu Mathur of Hindustan Times described it as "more brutal and graphic" than the first season but praised its emotional depth, stating it "retains enough sensitivity and finesse to be one of the best shows around." He singled out Tillotama Shome's "scene-stealing" performance and the show's focus on the investigators' personal lives..Neela Debnath of Express UK clarified that while inspired by the historical "Kachcha-Baniyan gangs" of 1990s North India, the season fictionalizes events rather than depicting a specific case. She detailed the gang's real-life tactics, including oil-covered bodies and posing as laborers, and noted director Tanuj Chopra's research into case files and community perspectives..Saibal Chatterjee of NDTV awarded the season 4/5 stars, applauding its "perceptive and powerful portrait of a city at war with itself." He noted its "near-documentary realism" and the layered portrayal of female characters, particularly Shah, Rasika Dugal, and Shome..Namrata Joshi of National Herald emphasized the series' examination of class conflict and police corruption, calling it "sharp and smart" while critiquing its occasional inauthenticity in dialogue delivery..Shweta Keshri of India Today noted that the season "lacks the depth of the first season" but provides a "peek into the lives of the cops." She praised Shah's "author-backed role" and Shome's "intense act," while critiquing the "grim and dark tale" as potentially challenging for some viewers..Udita Jhunjhunwala of Livemint praised the "rock-solid cast" but observed that the season "starts slow," with English-language dialogues feeling incongruous in a Delhi police setting. She commended its depiction of aspirational economics driving crime..Nandini Ramnath of Scroll.in offered a mixed assessment, calling the season a "clumsy exploration of systemic bias in policing." She compared it unfavorably to films like Oye Lucky! Lucky Oye! and Titli, which she felt better portrayed Delhi's aspirational crime. Ramnath criticized the "formulaic approach," uneven pacing, and incongruous English dialogue, adding that the show avoids addressing the Delhi Police's real-life controversies post-2019 protests..News18 highlighted the show's critique of caste and class structures, stating it "perfectly depicts" societal inequities through its "talented cast.".Sunny Mahat of The Annapurna Express lauded the series' intensity and Shome's performance, though cautioned viewers about its "gruesome" violence..Zee News highlighted positive social media reactions to the season, with netizens praising Shefali Shah's "brilliant" performance. Users lauded the series' gritty realism and called it a "worthy successor" to the first season. Many reviewers mentioned the excellent cinematography by David Bolen and music score by Ceiri Torjussen.

=== Season 3 ===
The third season received widespread acclaim from critics, with an 80% approval rating based on 5 reviews on Rotten Tomatoes. The Times of India rated it 4.5/5, calling it "social commentary disguised as a police drama". FirstPost called it "relevant, impactful, and immersive." Gulf News said that the show derived power from the fact that it is not easy to watch and refuses sensationalism. The Indian Express praised the acting, and expressed enthusiasm for the next season. The Hindustan Times said that the third season matched the quality of the previous ones. News18 called the season emotionally impactful aside from the slightly predictable conclusion. A more balanced review came from The Telegraph, which praised the show while saying that it was starting to fall into formulaic cliches. Outlook praised the performances, but felt that they were bogged down by a complicated script. The Hollywood Reporter accused it of being too apolitical. Audience reactions, while positive, were weaker than in previous seasons, with an average rating of 6.75/10.

== Awards and nominations ==
Year	Award	Category	Nominee(s)	Result	Ref.
2019	Asian Academy Creative Awards	Best Drama Series	Delhi Crime	Won	
2019	Asian Academy Creative Awards	Best Actress in a Leading Role	Shefali Shah	Won	
2019	Asian Academy Creative Awards	Best Original Programme by a Streamer/OTT	Delhi Crime	Won	
2019	Asian Academy Creative Awards	Best Direction (Fiction)	Richie Mehta	Won	
2019	Asian Academy Creative Awards	Best Original Screenplay	Richie Mehta	Nominated	
2019	Asian Academy Creative Awards	Best Editing	Beverley Mills	Nominated	
2019	iReel Awards	Best Drama Series	Delhi Crime	Won	
2019	iReel Awards	Best Actress -Drama	Shefali Shah	Won	
2019	iReel Awards	Best Supporting Actor	Rajesh Tailang	Nominated	
2019	iReel Awards	Best Writing -Drama	Richie Mehta	Won	
2020	International Emmy Awards	Best Drama Series	Delhi Crime	Won	
2023	International Emmy Awards	Best Actress	Shefali Shah	Nominated	
