= Tanuj Chopra =

American filmmaker

- Occupation(s): Director, Writer & producer
- Years active: 2003–present

Tanuj Chopra is an American film-maker. His debut feature film Punching at the Sun (2006) was screened at the Sundance Film Festival and was also nominated for the Humanitas Prize. He directed the Netflix web series Delhi Crime season 2 and season 3, whose first part was nominated for an International Emmy.

== Early life and education ==
Chopra was raised in Silicon Valley, and obtained a Bachelor of Arts (BA) in Semiotics from Brown University in 1999. He completed a Master of Fine Arts degree in film at the Columbia University School of the Arts in 2007, where he received the School of Art's Deans Fellowship and the FOCUS Film Fellowship.

== Career ==
Chopra made his first student film, Hate Crime, in the summer of 1998. As an undergraduate at Brown University, he wrote, directed and produced Uljhan, a 10-minute short film that played in festivals in New York and Los Angeles. In 2003, he directed, edited, and produced a short romance film entitled Butterfly, starring Tillotama Shome, which was shot in New Delhi and screened at over 20 festivals across North America, Europe, India and Pakistan. Butterfly won "Best Film" at the Napa Valley Wine Country Festival and the Ivy League Film Festival, the Audience Choice Award at the 2003 Asian Film Expo in Lyon, France, and a Director's Citation at the 2004 Black Maria Film and Video Festival.

In 2009, Chopra directed a short film entitled Chop Chop (2009) starring Sung Kang, Tillotama Shome and Manu Narayan. He wrote and directed a sci-fi short film in 2010 entitled Pia, starring Tillotama Shome and Pia Shah as an android/cyborg, for PBS's FutureStates project.

In 2011, Chopra directed The King's Speech Parody LOL, in partnership with the Center for Asian American Media (CAAM), to highlight the 29th Annual San Francisco International Asian American Film Festival's focus on South Asian film and filmmakers. He also directed and wrote a dystopian short film entitled Carbon Dated in 2011.

In 2012, Chopra directed a web series, again in partnership with CAAM, entitled Nice Girls Crew. Season 1 screened in 2012, and Season 2 of the series screened in 20d. He also directed the season 2 of web series Delhi Crime.

In 2014, Chopra wrote and directed a futuristic short film entitled Teacher In A Box (2014), again in partnership with the PBS FutureStates project, set in a future where teachers are replaced with digital avatars of themselves.

=== Music videos ===
Along with Prashant Bhargava, Chopra co-directed the music video for the Swetshop Boys' "Benny Lava". Chopra also directed the music videos for Chee Malabar's tracks "Harsh Truth", "Unbearable Sweetness", "Now Is Too Soon", and "Hamas 2.5". He has also directed various music videos and music pieces for jazz pianist Vijay Iyer.

=== Documentaries ===
Chopra has worked on several documentaries. His Project Heart: Uganda series focused on the work of the World Children Initiative treating children's heart disease in Uganda. His documentary SAYA! Turns Ten is a commissioned piece about the Queens, New York based non-profit organization South Asian Youth Action.

=== Feature films ===
In 2006, Chopra wrote, produced, and directed his first feature film, Punching at the Sun, depicting the life of a troubled South Asian teen (Misu Khan) living in Queens, New York. It premiered at the 2006 Sundance Film Festival as the first South Asian American film to be selected to the festival. At Sundance, it was nominated for a Humanitas Prize. The film also screened at the 2006 Tribeca Film Festival and the 2006 San Francisco International Asian American Film Festival, where it won the Jury Award for Best Narrative film. It has been screened at over 30 film festivals, and was released online in 2008 via Jaman.com.

Chopra started work on the Kickstarter crowd-funded indie feature film Nature Boy in 2011, which tells the story of an ex-tennis champion who finds himself washed up and disconnected in his hometown at age 33.

Chopra makes his films under the label "Chops Films".

== Filmography ==
Year	Film	Director	Writer	Producer	Notes
2006	Punching at the Sun	✓	✓	✗	
2015	Nature Boy	✓	✗	✓	
2015	Grass	✓	✓	✓	Story
2016	Chee and T	✓	✓	✗	

== Miscellaneous ==
Chopra serves on the board of the Palo Alto International Film Festival, and assists with the New Voices for Youth Film-making Initiative.
