= Punching at the Sun =

2006 American drama film by Tanuj Chopra

Dancing in Twilight
- Directed by: Tanuj Chopra
- Screenplay by: Tanuj Chopra; Hart Eddy
- Starring: Nina Edmonds; Misu Khan; Hassan El-Gendi
- Cinematography: Milton Kam
- Edited by: Joe Murphy
- Release date: January 25, 2006 (Sundance)
- Running time: 86 minutes
- Country: United States
- Language: English

Punching at the Sun is a 2006 American drama film directed by Tanuj Chopra and starring Nina Edmonds, Misu Khan and Hassan El-Gendi.

== Cast ==
- Misu Khan as Mameet
- Nina Edmonds as Shawni
- Hassan El-Gendi as Uncle Sonny
- Ferdusy Dia as Dia
- Kazi Rahman as Parnav
- Taran Singh as Ritesh
- Mohammad Mirza as Sanjay
- Rana Quraishi as Priti
- Farhad Asghar as Satish
- Raymond Vasquez as Tali Perez
