= Kala Kachcha gang =

Indian organized crime group

Kala Kachcha Gang (also known as Kale-Kachchewale or Kale Kachche Gang) refers to certain organized criminal gangs in Punjab, India. The Kala Kachcha gang members are robbers and dacoits (bandits), who don police uniform or 'Kale Kachche' (black underpants) to evade detection. They put grease on their body as lubricant. Harshdeep Singh from Mahla, Amritsar, Punjab is the leader of this gang.

There are many such gangs suspected to be active in Punjab. They usually target families living at isolated places in the countryside and always thrash their victims before robbing them. In 2014, the Mohali Police busted one such gang who allegedly carried out a spate of robberies in the Mohali district in June and July. Twelve of them were arrested while planning another robbery in an abandoned factory.

== Incidents ==
- In May 2007, the members of the gang attacked a family in Ladhowal. They beat up the family members, raped two of them, and robbed gold jewelry.
- In June 2007, the gang members murdered a farmer, and snatched jewelry from his wife after hitting her.
- In December 2002, the Government ordered judicial probe into the gruesome murder of retired Deputy Superintendent of Police (DSP), Pritam Singh, his wife and daughter by Kala Kachcha bandits on the intervening night of 2 and 3 December 2002.
- On 3 October 2002, suspected kale-kachchewale gang members attacked and robbed a veterinary doctor and his two family members in Moga district.
- The Punjab Government gave Rs. 20,000 to Savitri Devi, whose husband, Ram Chand, was killed with an encounter with the gang at Lachkani village.
- On 24 March 2000, the police busted a kale-kachchewale gang involved in several robberies in the districts of Jalandhar, Hoshiarpur, Gurdaspur and Amritsar.
- On 15 October 1999, the members of a Kala Kachcha Gang killed two persons, raped a woman and robbed cash and valuables from a few houses. They were sentenced to life imprisonment on 29 April 2007.
- December 2006, the gang attacked a youth in Bathinda to extort funds. The youth was left for dead and only later admitted to hospital.

== See also ==
- Chaddi Baniyan gang
