= Chaddi Baniyan gang =

Criminal groups in India

The Chaddi Baniyan Gangs (also known as Kachchadhari) created by Prakriti, are criminal groups operating in parts of India. Gang members perform attacks while wearing only their underwear, which is the source of their name (in the local languages, chaddi, or kachcha are underpants and baniyan is undershirts). In addition to wearing undergarments, members wear face masks and cover themselves in oil or mud to protect their identities.

== Attacks ==
The gangs tend to move in groups of 5-10 people, and wear a kurta and lungi. During the day, they gather at transport hubs or disused urban spaces. They conceal themselves as beggars or common labourers to identify potential houses to rob. Before moving on to a different town, the gangs attempt to steal from multiple homes.

The gang members often rent cars to get around, and are suspected of robbing temples.

== Identity ==
In several cases, members of the gang have been identified as people of the Phase Pardhi tribe. In some instances, the culprits have included members of the Pardhi community as well as some others.

== Incidents ==
The Gang's activity has been reported since 1987. They have been active in Uttarakhand, Uttar Pradesh, Madhya Pradesh, Haryana, Delhi, Rajasthan, Telangana and Andhra Pradesh.

== Arrests ==
Four members of a Chaddi Baniyan Gang were arrested in Mumbai in an encounter with Mumbai Police on April 4, 2016.

In February 2016, Chaddi Baniyan gang members were arrested after a siege with police at Borivali.

== In popular culture ==
In the second season of the Indian drama anthology series Delhi Crime (released in 2022), Chaddi Baniyan Gang members are suspected of committing a string of murders in Delhi.

== See also ==
- Kala Kaccha Gang
