= Hamersley (surname) =

Hamersley is a surname. Notable people with the surname include:

- Hamersley family, Australian family including:
  - Edward Hamersley (senior) (1810–1874)
  - Edward Hamersley (junior) (1835 or 1836 – 1921)
  - Samuel Hamersley (1842–1896)
  - Vernon Hamersley (1871–1946)
- Catherine Livingston Hamersley (1891–1977) philanthropist, society figure, and the first American woman to visit the Najd city of Riyadh
- Harold A. Hamersley (1896–1967), Australian World War I flying ace
- Sir Hugh Hamersley (1565–1636), 17th century businessman and Lord Mayor of London
- J. Hooker Hamersley (1844–1901), American heir, lawyer and poet during the Gilded Age.
- Louis Gordon Hamersley (1892–1942), American sportsman, piloting and racing boats, and real estate investor
- Michael Hamersley, American tax lawyer and corporate whistleblower against the accounting firm KPMG's tax shelter fraud
