= Hamersley =

Hamersley may refer to:

== People ==
- Hamersley (surname)
- The Hamersley family, Australian family

== Toponyms ==
- Hamersley, Western Australia is a suburb of Perth, Western Australia
- Hamersley Range, a mountain range in northwestern Western Australia
- Hamersley River, an ephemeral river in the Great Southern region of Western Australia
- Hamersley National Park, the former name of Karijini National Park in northwestern Western Australia
- Hamersley Station, a pastoral lease in the Pilbara region of Western Australia

== See also ==
- Hammersley
- Hämmerli, a European manufacturer of firearms
