= Bard College Campus =

College campus in New York, US

Coordinates: 42.023°N 73.907°W

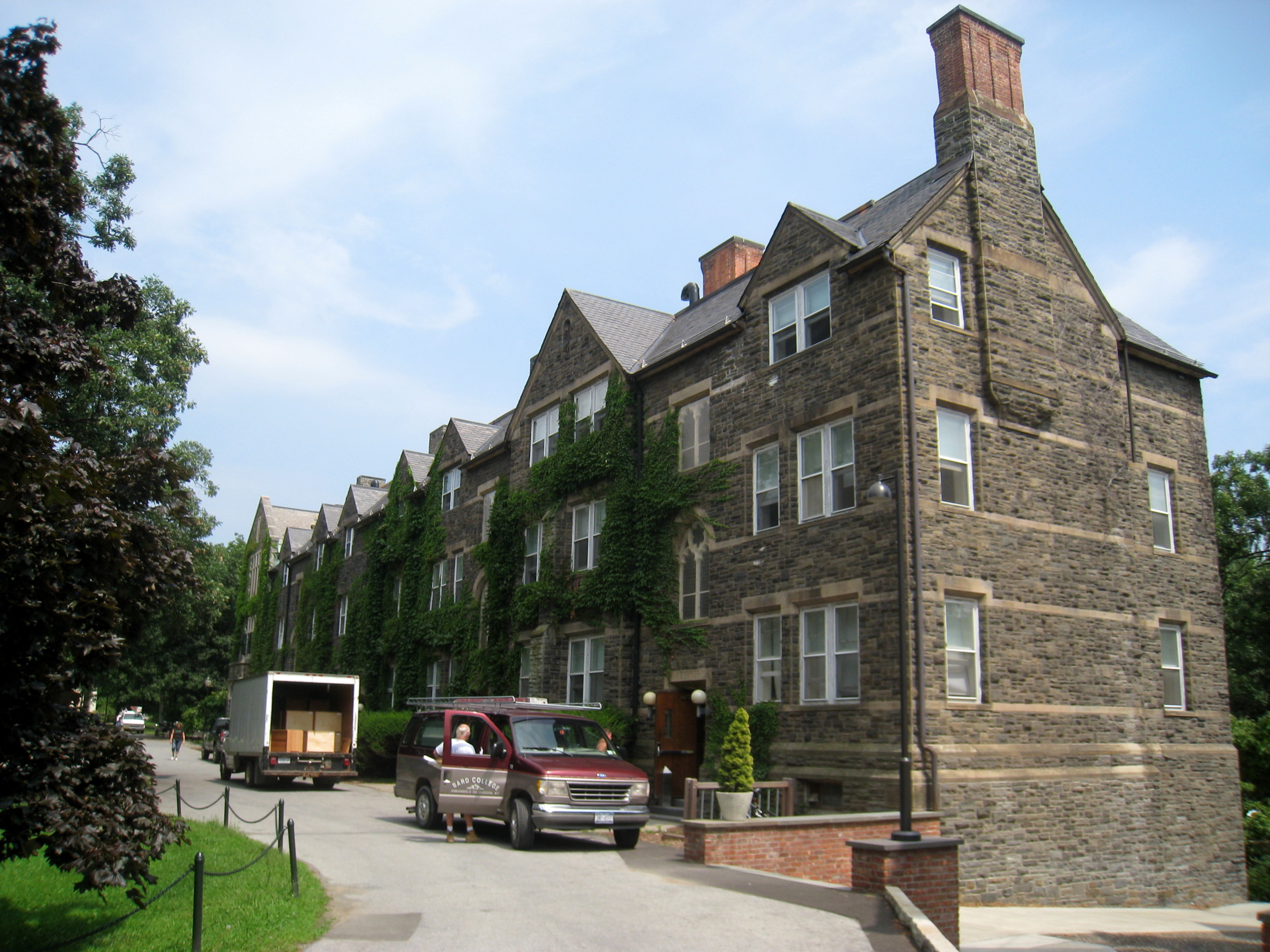
College buildings

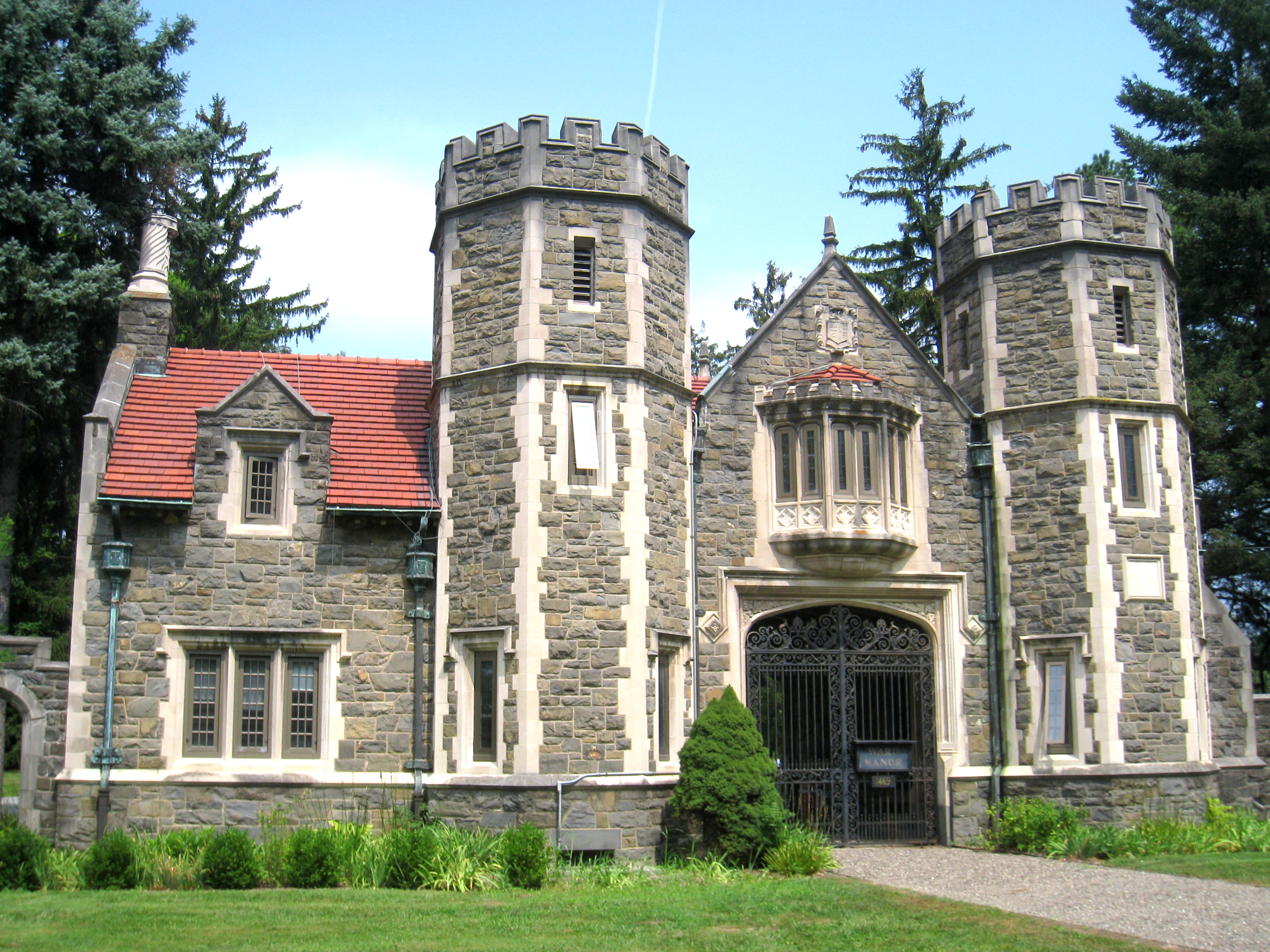
Ward Gate at Bard College, August 2009

The campus of Bard College comprises 1,000 acres (400 ha) in Annandale-on-Hudson, New York. The campus, situated on the east shore of the Hudson River, offers sweeping views of the Catskill Mountains and is within the Hudson River Historic District, a National Historic Landmark. Almost all campus buildings built prior to 1950 are listed on the National Register of Historic Places as contributing features to the historic district.

The campus contains more than 70 buildings with a total gross building space of 1,167,090 square feet (108,426 m^{2}). Campus buildings represent varied architectural styles, but the campus remains heavily influenced by the Collegiate Gothic and Postmodern styles.

Bard's historic buildings are associated with the early development of the college and the history of the Hudson River estates (see Bard College History). During a late twentieth-century building boom, the college embraced a trend of building signature buildings designed by prominent architects like Robert Venturi, Frank Gehry, and Rafael Viñoly.

== Campus organization ==
Route 9G, a New York State highway, provides access to the Bard campus at Annandale Road, Campus Road, and River Road. The geographic organization of the campus is centered around Annandale Road, which serves as the de facto campus thoroughfare. The campus comprises four distinct, but unified, regions due to its size and historical development: Central Campus, North Campus, South Campus and Montgomery Place Campus. Each historically rich region is host to both historic and contemporary architecture. Additionally, the campus includes the undeveloped woodlands as far west as the Tivoli Bays Wildlife Management Area, which consists of the North Tivoli Bay, South Tivoli Bay, Cruger Island, Magdalen Island, and many acres of upland forest.

== Central campus and historic core ==
Central Campus serves as the administrative and academic core of the college. Central Campus also includes the historic core, the geographic area that encompasses the majority of Bard's historic buildings. Buildings within the historic core are heavily influenced by the collegiate gothic style and were designed by prominent American architects between the mid-nineteenth century to the early twentieth century. Outside of the historic core, central campus is significant for its postmodern structures built after the 1980s.

=== Library complex ===
Stevenson, Kellogg, Hoffman

General information
- Architectural style: Postmodern, Brutalist, Neoclassical
- Location: Central Campus
- Completed: 1993, 1973, 1893

Technical details
- Floor count: 2-4

Design and construction
- Architects: Robert Venturi, 1993 addition

The library is a complex of three buildings, each built in different architectural styles. Hoffman was constructed in 1893, Kellogg in 1973, and Stevenson in 1993.

The Greek Revival Hoffman Memorial Library was named after trustee and donor Charles Hoffman. When constructed, the library was the only building on campus not designed in the Collegiate Gothic style. The terra-cotta brick temple, built in the ionic order, cost $73,000 to construct and was one of the first fireproof structures in the nation. The building was designed to be a physical representation of the college's early emphasis on Classical studies.

The Kellogg Library wing, designed by S.M.S. Architects in New Canaan, CT, was added in 1973. Following a trend among college campuses, the wing was built in the brutalist style. It strikingly juxtaposes with the original Hoffman Library.

The postmodern Stevenson addition was constructed in 1993 and designed by acclaimed architect Robert Venturi. In addition to designing the new 27,500 square foot wing, Venturi renovated the existing 25,000 square foot Hoffman and Kellogg complex. In designing the interior, Venturi, following in the footsteps of Louis Kahn, placed the stacks in the center of the building, whereas seating areas were designed near the windows.

The Venturi addition is a contemporary counterpart to its neighboring temple. The south elevation of the building prominently features colorful, vertical, rhythms that mimic, yet contrast, the columns of the Hoffman Library. The west elevation features a patterned, tan-colored, brick facade. The north facade is plain tan-colored brick that relates with the Kellogg wing. Venturi incorporated three different facades in order to relate the Stevenson wing to Hoffman and Kellogg.

Additionally, Venturi designed a propylaeum that evokes of classicism, with a contemporary flare. The propylaeum leads into an outdoor entrance plaza that provides dramatic views of a muddy field and the Catskill Mountains to the west.

=== F.W. Olin Humanities Building ===
Olin Hall
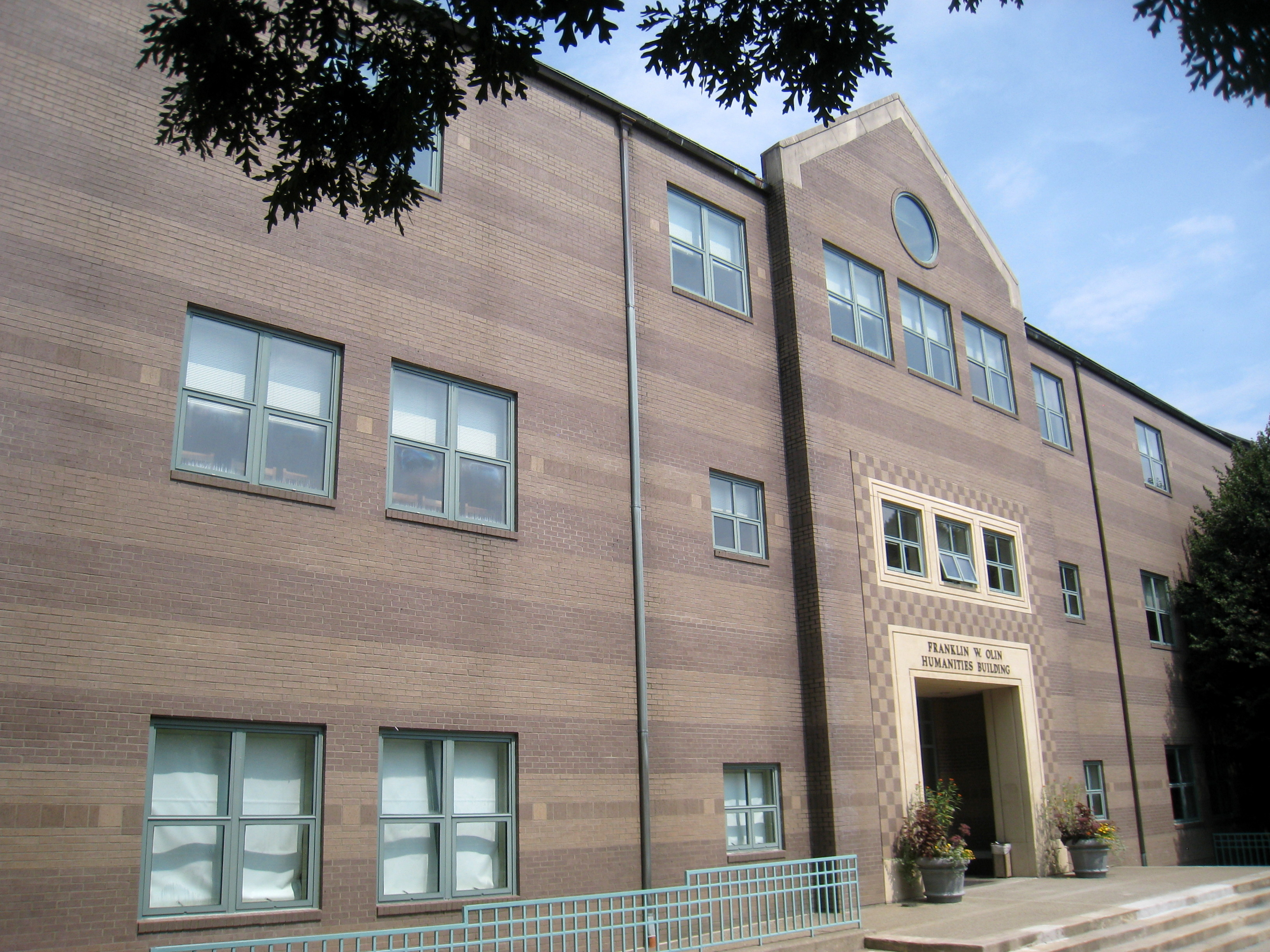

General information
- Architectural style: Postmodern
- Location: Central Campus
- Completed: 1987

Technical details
- Floor count: 3

Design and construction
- Architect: Cathy Simon

The Franklin W. Olin Humanities Building, built in 1987 and designed by Cathy Simon of Simon Martin-Vegue Winkelstein Moris (prior to its merger with Perkins+Will), serves as the main academic building for the anthropology, history, philosophy, religion, literature, creative writing, foreign languages, art history, and music history department. The building comprises small lecture rooms, seminar rooms, an art history room, and a poetry room. Behind the main academic building, a 380-seat concert hall is attached to the main building by a glass lobby that features a circular interior colonnade.

In designing the building, Simon was influenced by postmodern historicism, a trend that calls for the exploration and reinterpretation of past architectural traditions. The building subtly echoes the nearby collegiate gothic structures in color, shape, and size. The Olin building had to complement its surroundings due to its unique location; the building forms, and serves as the anchor of, a quadrangle that did not exist prior to its construction.

=== Bard Hall ===
Bard Hall
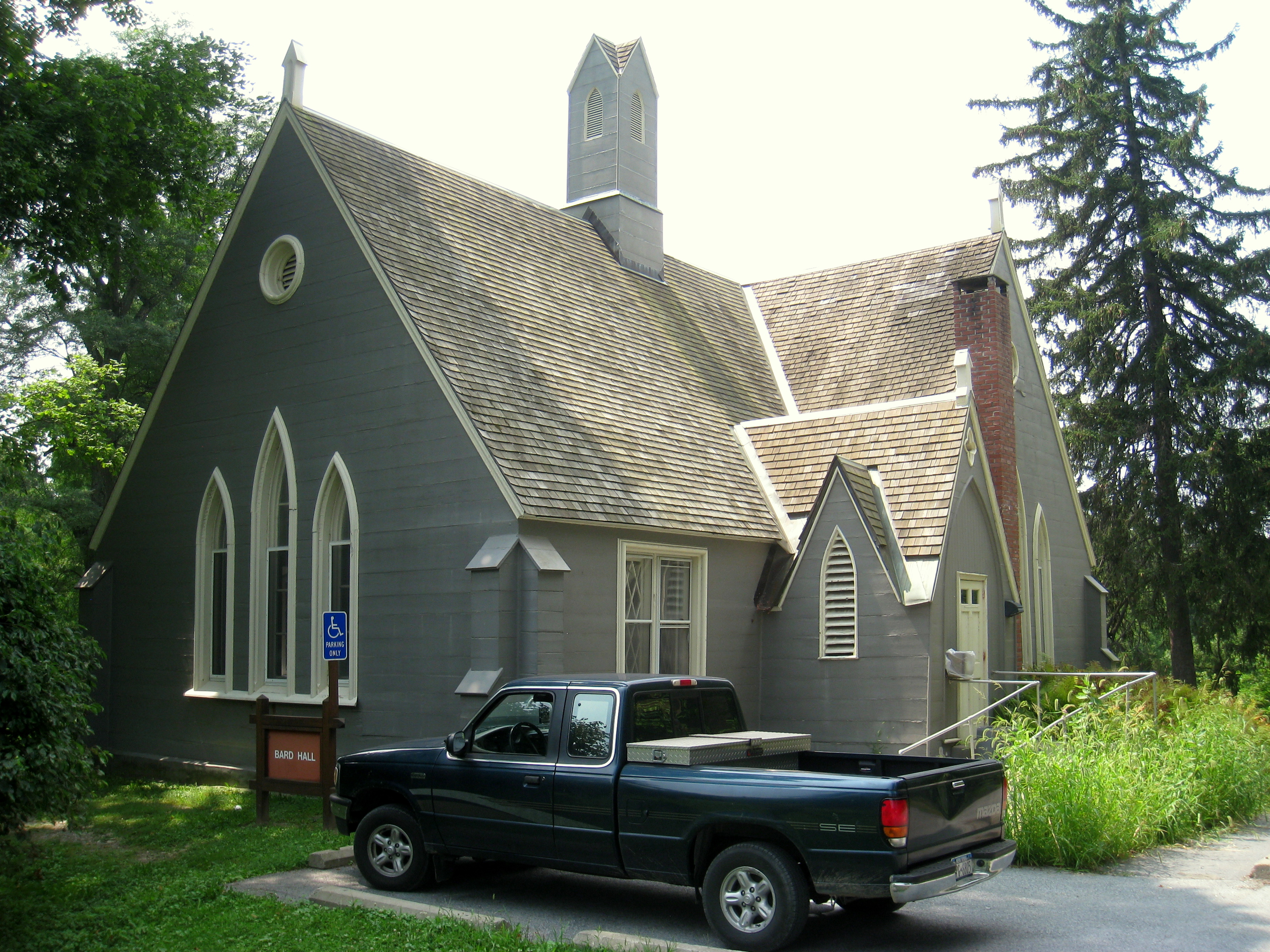

General information
- Architectural style: Gothic Revival
- Location: Historic Core
- Completed: 1854

Technical details
- Structural system: Wood Frame
- Floor count: 1

Built in 1854, Bard Hall was commissioned by the John Bard family in order to serve as a chapel and parish school for Annandale village. The building was built before the founding of the college, in 1860. The building was designed in the gothic revival style.

=== Chapel of the Holy Innocents ===
Chapel of the Holy Innocents
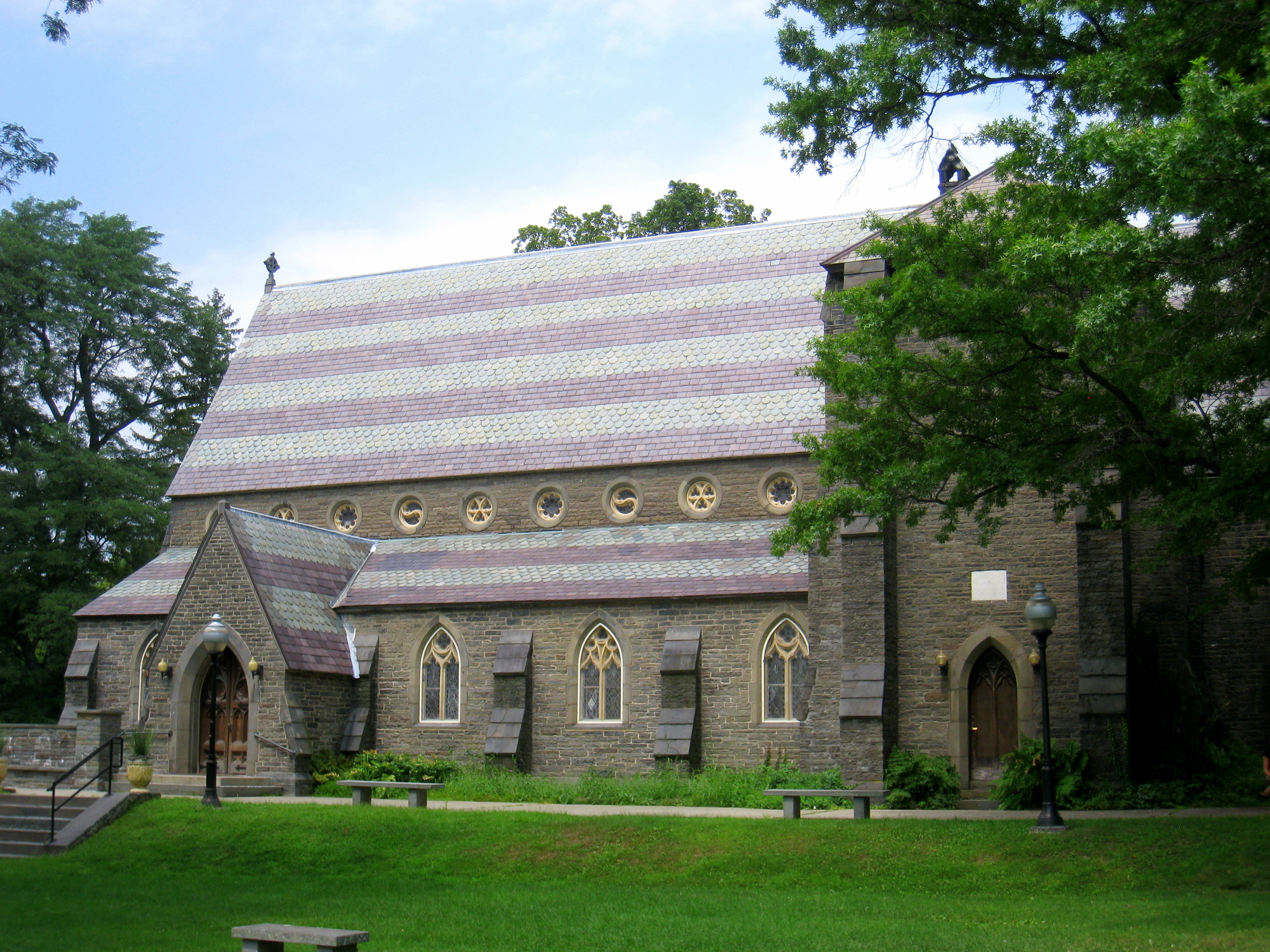

General information
- Type: Church
- Architectural style: Gothic Revival
- Location: Historic Core
- Completed: 1859

Technical details
- Structural system: Masonry

Design and construction
- Architect: Charles Babcock

The chapel, built in 1859, was commissioned by the John Bard family in 1857. The original chapel was designed in the gothic revival style by Frank Wills. In 1858, two days after Christmas, the chapel was destroyed by a fire caused by a defective flue. Because the chapel was uninsured, a new building was constructed at the cost of $34,000. The existing chapel was constructed in 1859 by Charles Babcock. In 1915, the interior of the chapel was redesigned by acclaimed architect Ralph Adams Cram.

A well on the north side of the church, dedicated in 1888, was fundraised by ladies of the parish to commemorate John Bard's First Wife. An inscription on the well reads "St Margaret's Well, erected in 1887, in loving memory of Margaret Johnston Bard. 'I was thirsty and ye gave me a drink."

=== Ludlow and Willink ===
Ludlow Hall
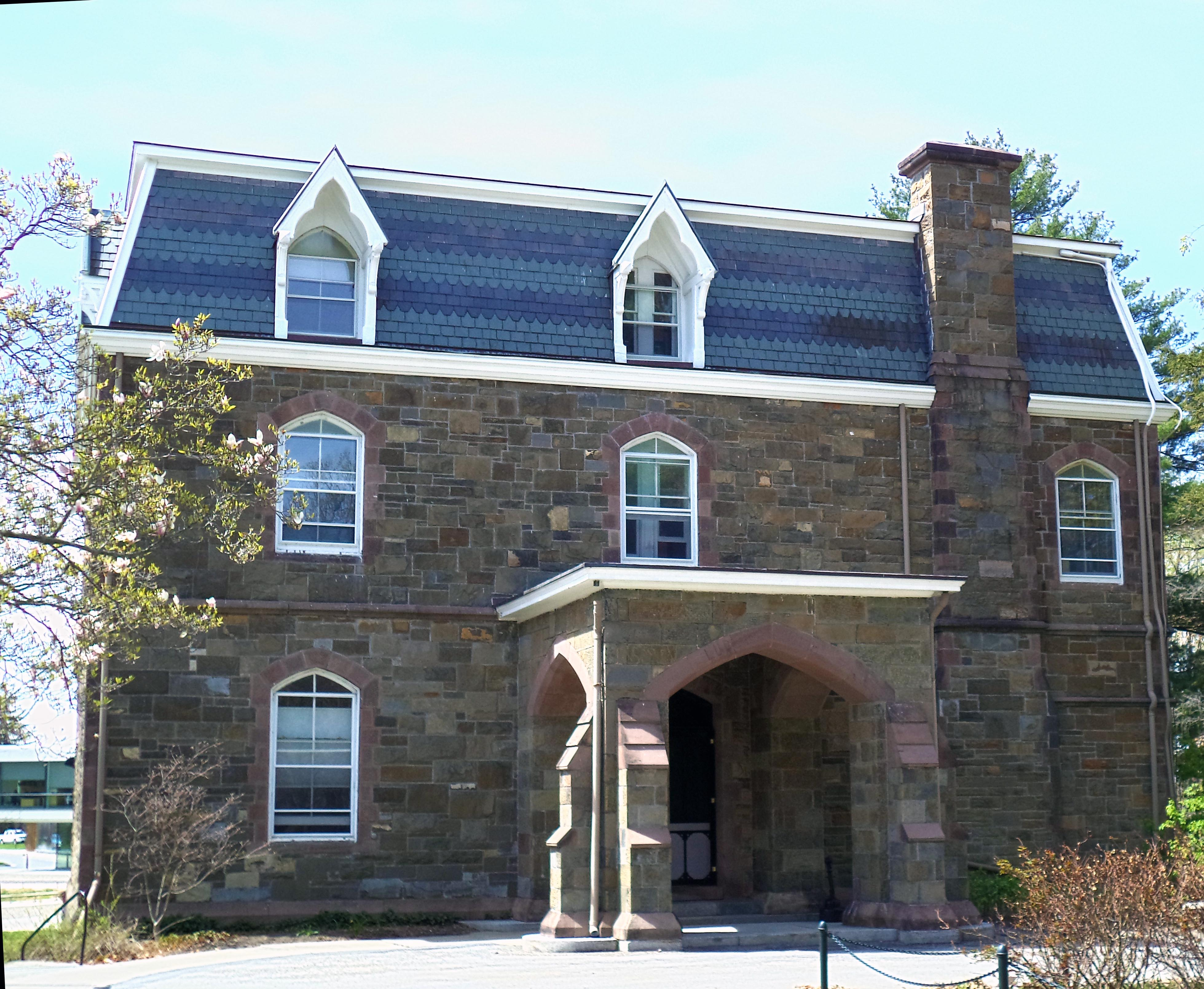

General information
- Location: Historic Core
- Completed: 1869

Technical details
- Floor count: 1

Design and construction
- Architect: Richard Upjohn

Ludlow and Willink was built in 1869 and currently serves as the main administrative building on campus. It houses the Offices of the President, Vice President for Administration, Dean of the college, and the Registrar. The building, which cost $53,000, was designed in the collegiate gothic style with second empire detailing by renowned architect Richard Upjohn.

== North Campus ==
North Campus was formed in 1963, when Bard purchased the 90 acres (36 ha) Ward Manor estate. North Campus, excluding the Fisher Center, consists entirely of student dormitories. Postmodern architecture and historicism is distinctly evident in this part of campus. Dormitories like Cruger Village and New Robbins evoke, with a contemporary flare, the historic agricultural buildings that existed in the area.

=== Ward Manor ===
Ward Manor
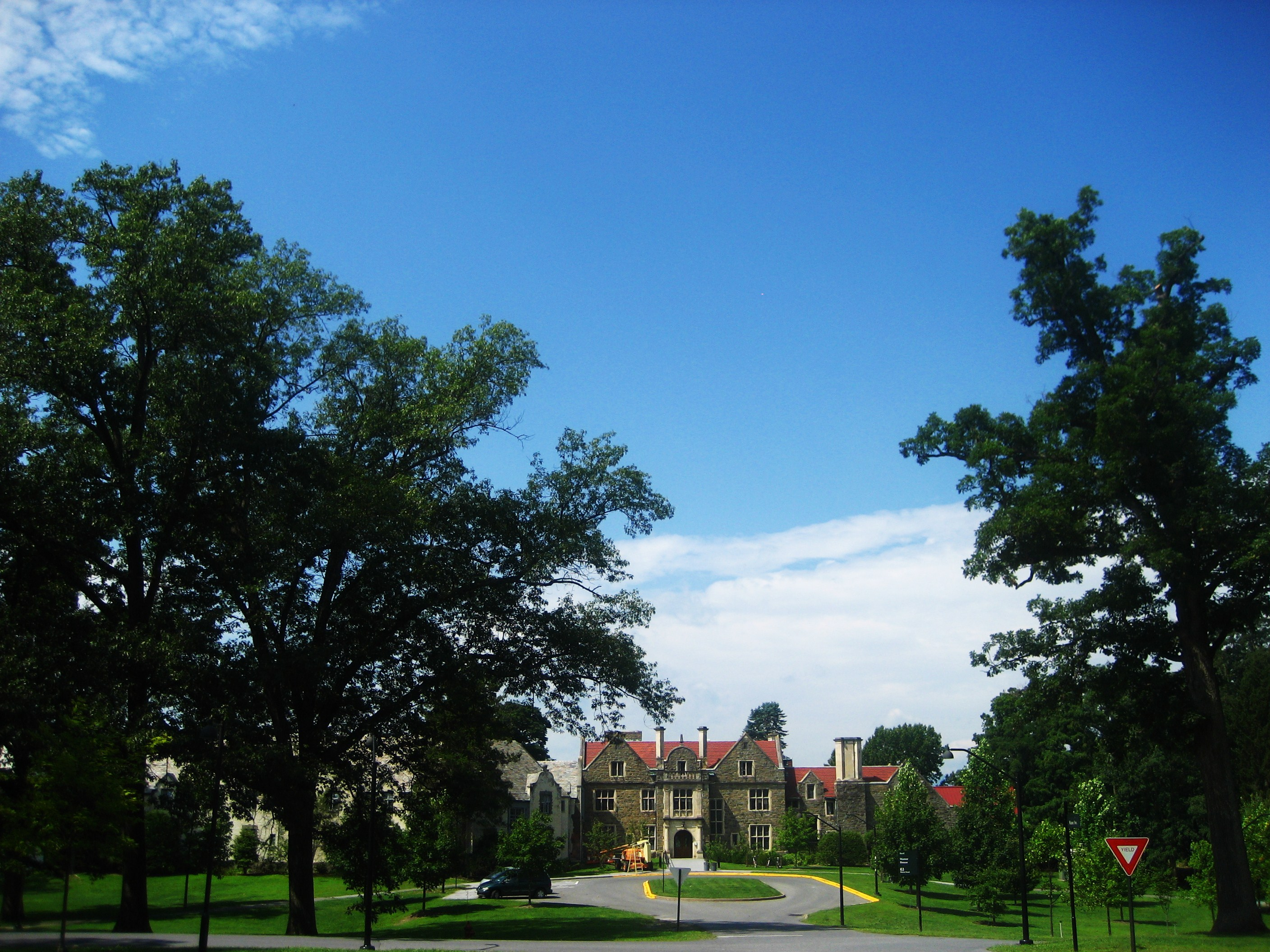

General information
- Type: Dormitory, Cafe
- Architectural style: Tudor Revival
- Location: North Campus
- Completed: 1918, 1929

Technical details
- Structural system: Masonry

Design and construction
- Architect: Francis Laurens Vinton Hoppin

The first residence constructed on the Ward Manor property was commissioned by General John Armstrong Jr. around 1790. At the time, the estate was named The Meadows. In 1914, Louis Gordon Hamersley purchased the estate and erected a Tudor Revival style mansion and gatehouse designed by Francis Hoppin, what today is Ward Manor House and the Ward Gatehouse. Hamersley expanded his estate, acquiring several farms to the north, and finally the Cruger's Island estate in 1920. In 1926, William B. Ward purchased the combined estate in memory of his father Robert (founder of the Ward Baking Company, and immediately donated it to the Association for Improving the Condition of the Poor. The mansion was renovated as a retirement home, and an annex was added in 1931. Both Manor House and Manor Annex served as a retirement home until Bard purchased the estate in 1963.

Today, the Ward Manor complex serves as a student dormitory. Manor Cafe is located on the first floor of the building, and the Manor lounge serves as a student study space, open on weekdays until 2a.m.

=== Fisher Center for the Performing Arts ===
Richard B. Fisher Center for Performing Arts
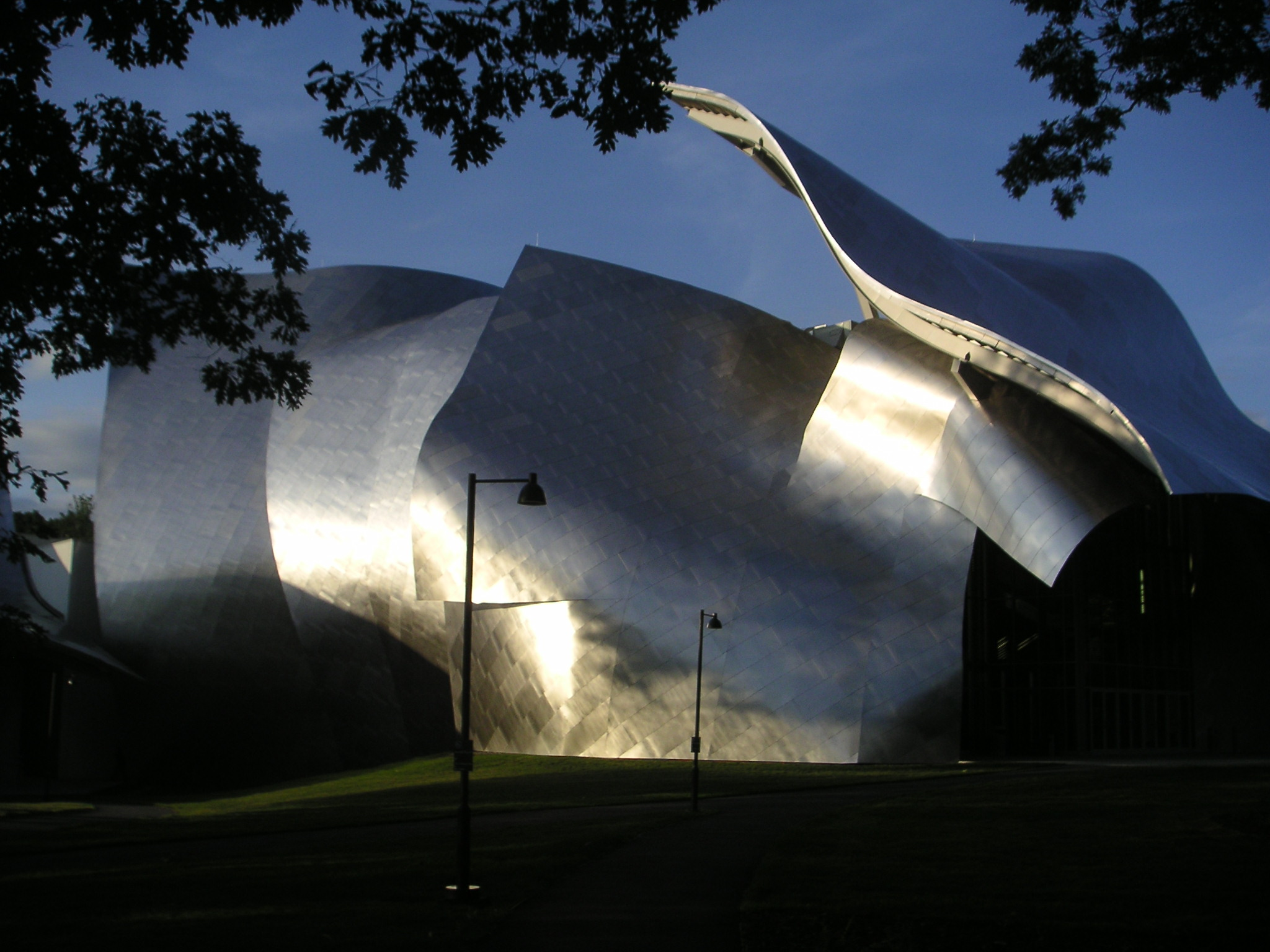

General information
- Architectural style: Postmodern, deconstructivist
- Location: North Campus
- Current tenants: American Symphony Orchestra, Theatre Department, Dance Department
- Completed: 2003

Technical details
- Structural system: Reinforced concrete

Design and construction
- Architect: Frank Gehry

The Fisher Center for the Performing Arts is a metal-clad, deconstructivist building designed by acclaimed architect Frank Gehry.

== South Campus ==
In addition to undergraduate academic and residential buildings, South Campus is home to the Center for Curatorial Studies and Art in Contemporary Culture, The László Z. Bitó Conservatory Building, and Blithewood Manor, home of the Levy Economics Institute. South Campus is also home to Donald G. Tewksbury Hall, a corridor-style residence hall opened in 1958 and designed by alumni Sidney Shelov '37 and Peter-Paul Muller '40, known among students for its lively atmosphere.

=== Bertelsmann Campus Center ===
Bertelsmann Campus Center
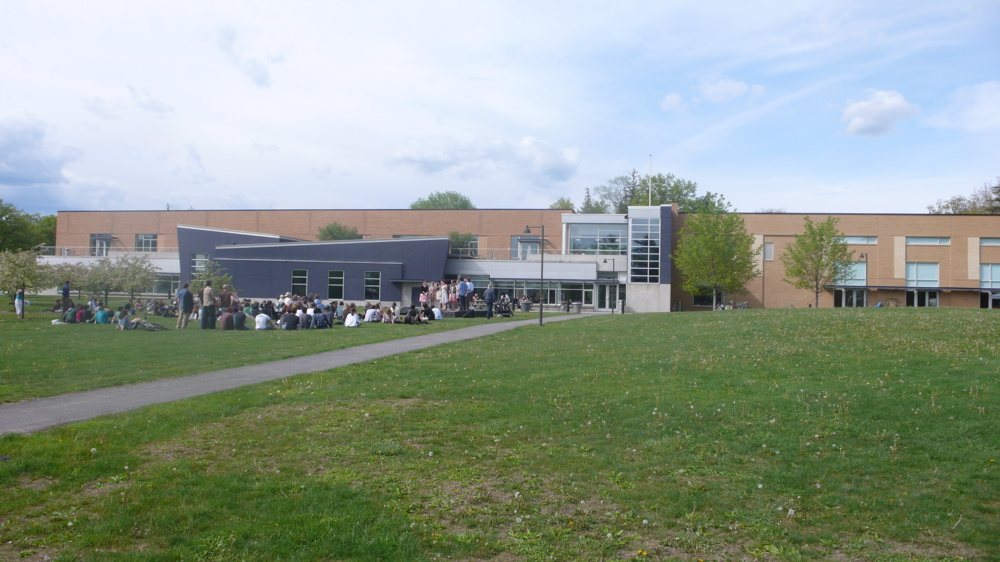

General information
- Type: Student Center and Services
- Architectural style: Postmodern
- Location: South Campus
- Completed: 1999

Technical details
- Structural system: Reinforced concrete
- Floor count: 2

Design and construction
- Architect: Cathy Simon of Perkins+Will

The postmodern Campus Center, designed by Cathy Simon of Perkins+Will, is a 30,000-square-foot facility that opened in 1999. The facade incorporates tan-colored brick and blue EIFS. The spacious building features oversized windows and, like Simon's Olin Humanities Building, exhibits a distinct separation of functions. Weis Cinema, a 100-seat theater, protrudes from the South side of the building, whereas the Multi-Purpose Room encompasses the entire building footprint on the eastern end.

In addition to lounge areas and student space, the Campus Center is host to several student-oriented offices, like the Career Development Office, the Trustee Leader Scholar Office, and the Student Activities Office.

=== Blithewood Manor ===
The name Blithewood dates back to Robert Donaldson Jr. of North Carolina who purchased the estate in 1830 and hired landscape designer Andrew Jackson Downing to transform the grounds. In 1853, John Bard purchased a corner of the Blithewood estate to found St. Stephens college, which would eventually become Bard College.

Captain Andrew C. Zabriskie purchased the land from Bard in 1899 and commissioned Francis Hoppin to build a manor house and gardens on the estate. The manor was built in an English influenedd Beaux-Arts style. Zabriskie's son would eventually donate the estate, along with its manor to Bard College in 1951. In 1987, the college designated the estate to be under the ownership of the Levy Economics Institute. Aside from the Levy Economics Institute, the Blithewood manor houses offices for Bard scholars and staff, a library, and lecture and meeting rooms.

== Forest ==
The forest to the west of Bard extends from Sawkill Creek in the south to Cruger Road in the north. This mixed hardwood forest lies on a series of valleys descending from Bard College campus to South Bay, which lies separated from the Hudson by a railroad. The forest is relatively young and light competition and density are high. The forest contains several ruins in the form of cellars and foundations. Archaeological studies of this area's use by Native Americans are currently underway by resident archaeologist Christopher Lindner. This forest and the surrounding area suffer from an overpopulation of deer; Accordingly, undergrowth foliage is sparse and Lyme disease is very common among deer ticks in this area.

== Cemetery ==
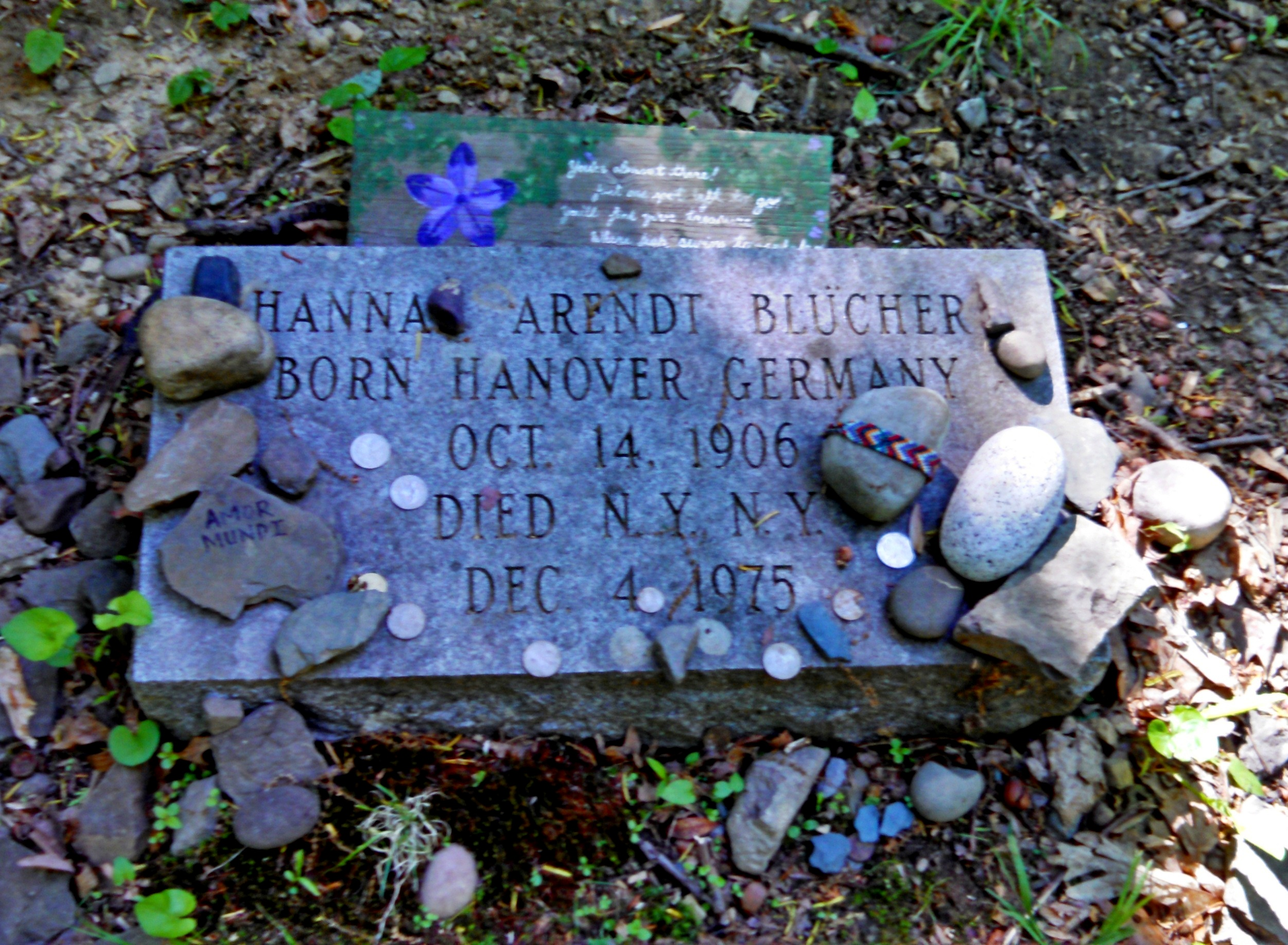
Grave of Hannah Arendt, located at the cemetery.

A small cemetery is located at the school. Notable interments include:

- Hannah Arendt (1906–1975), writer
- Heinrich Blücher (1899–1970), philosopher
- Anthony Hecht (1923–2004), poet
- Adolfas Mekas (1925–2011), filmmaker
- Justus Rosenberg (1921–2021), academic
- Philip Roth (1933–2018), writer
- Peter Serkin (1947–2020), pianist

== Gallery ==
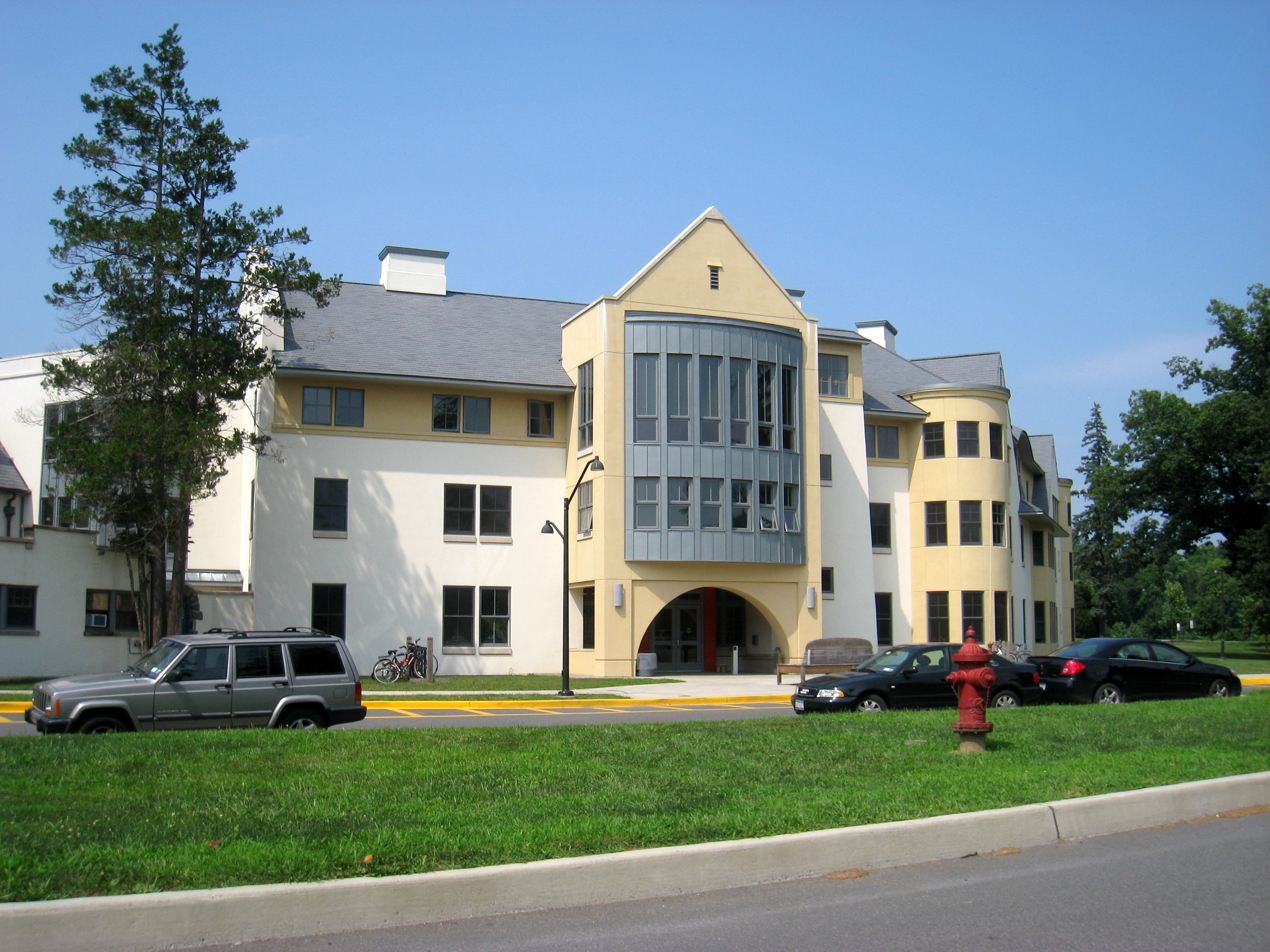
Robbins Dormitory Addition

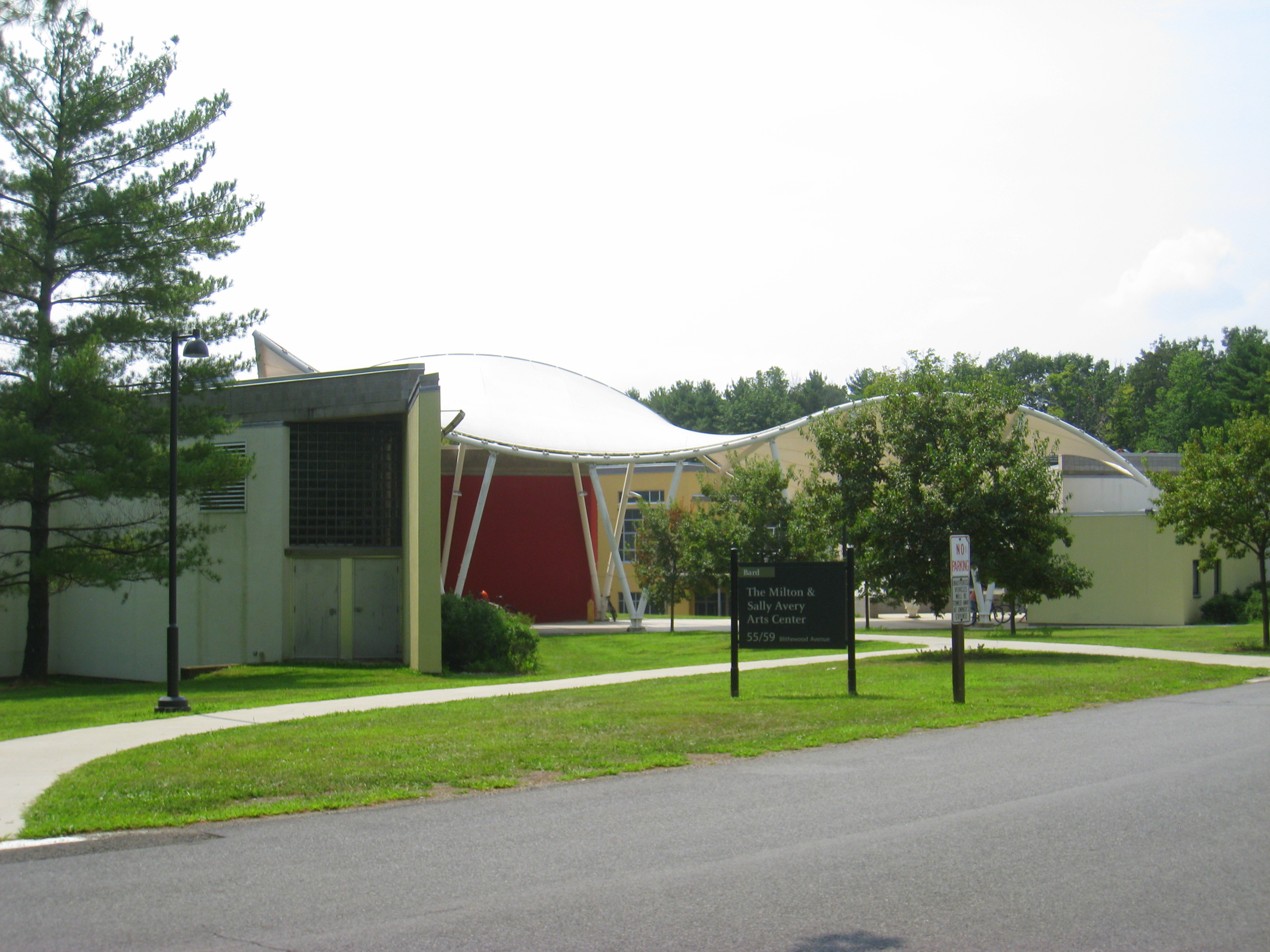
Milton and Sally Avery Arts Center

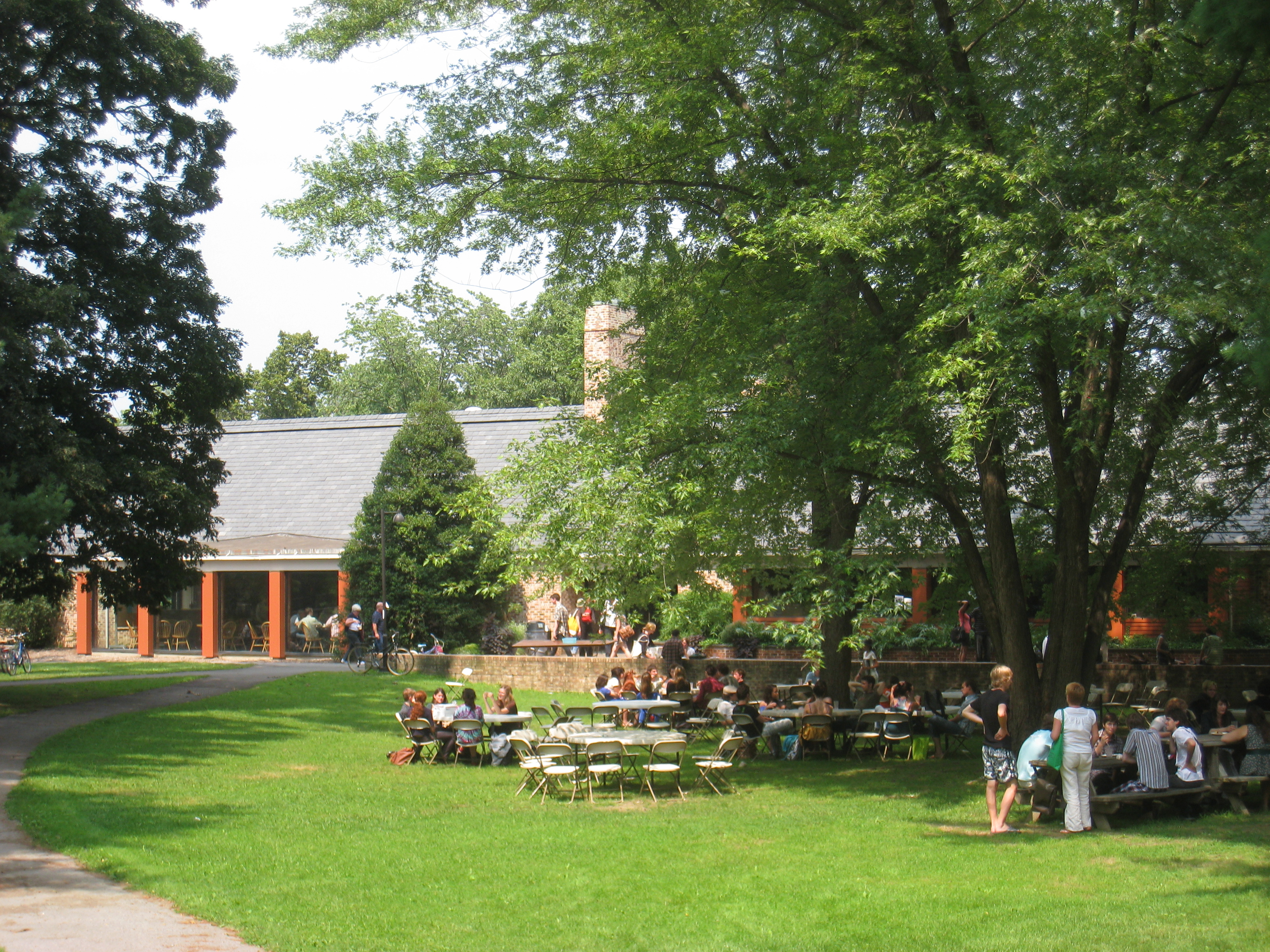
Kline Commons, dining Hall

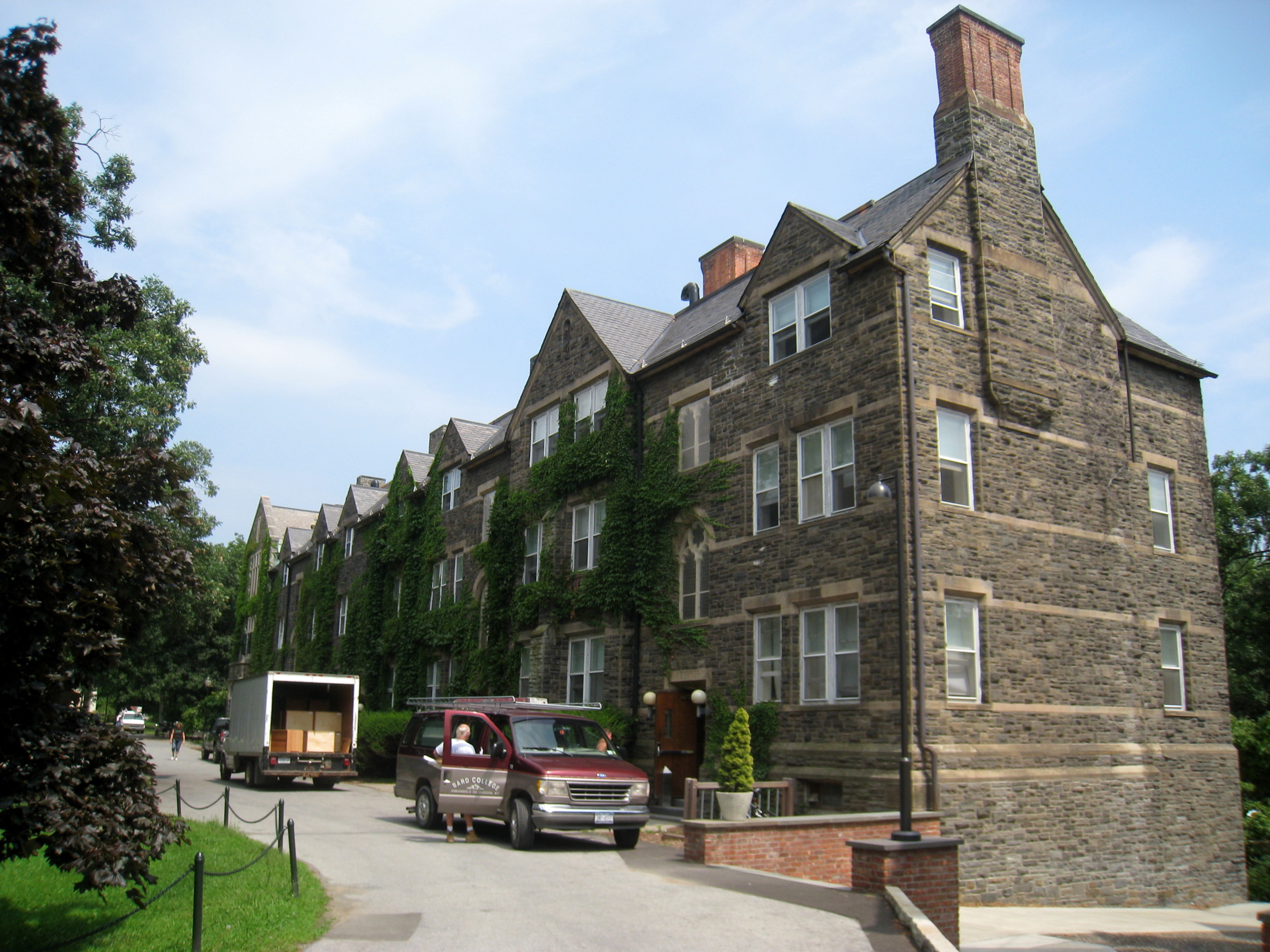
Stone Row dormitories

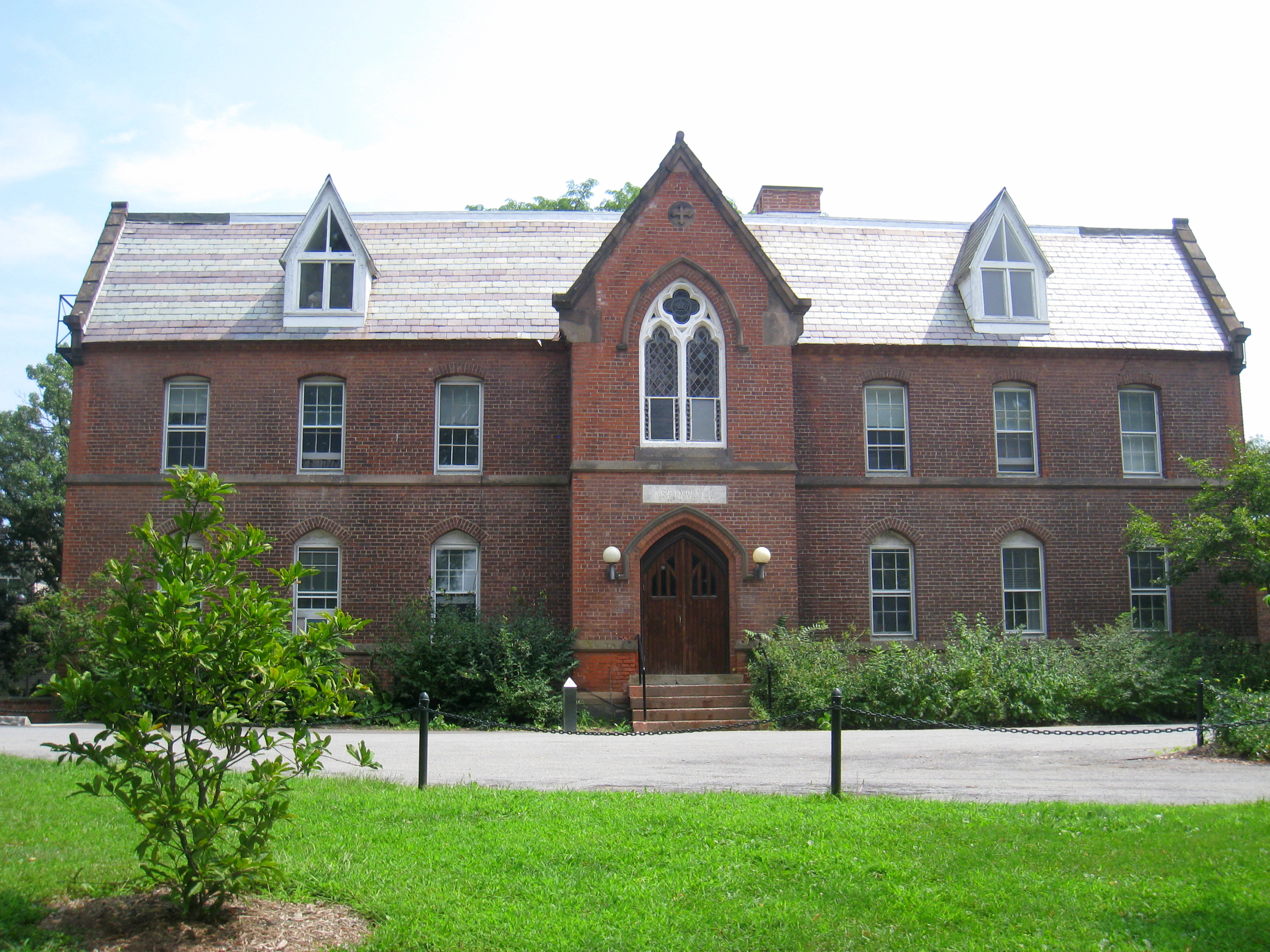
Aspinwall Hall

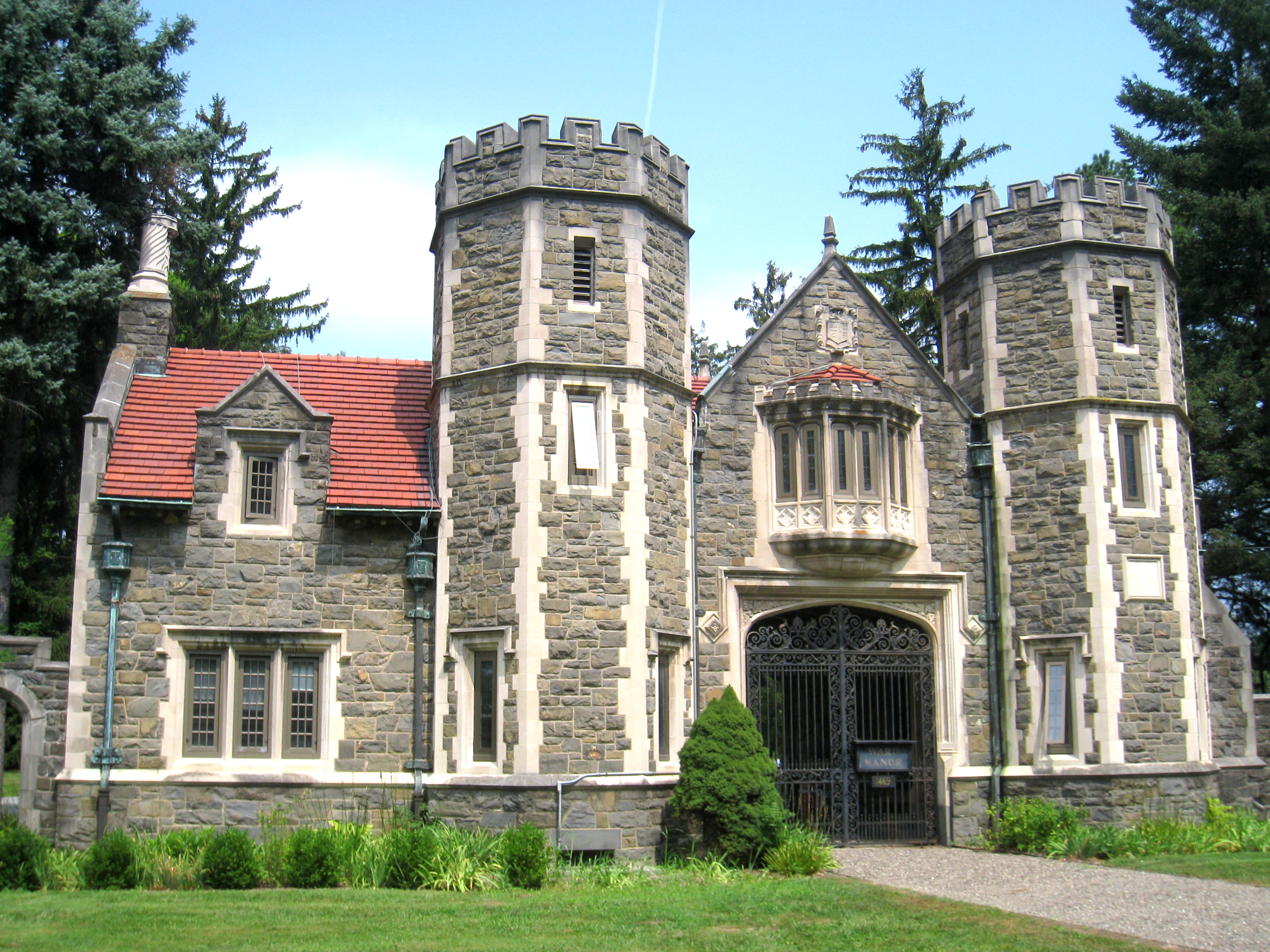
Ward Manor Gatehouse

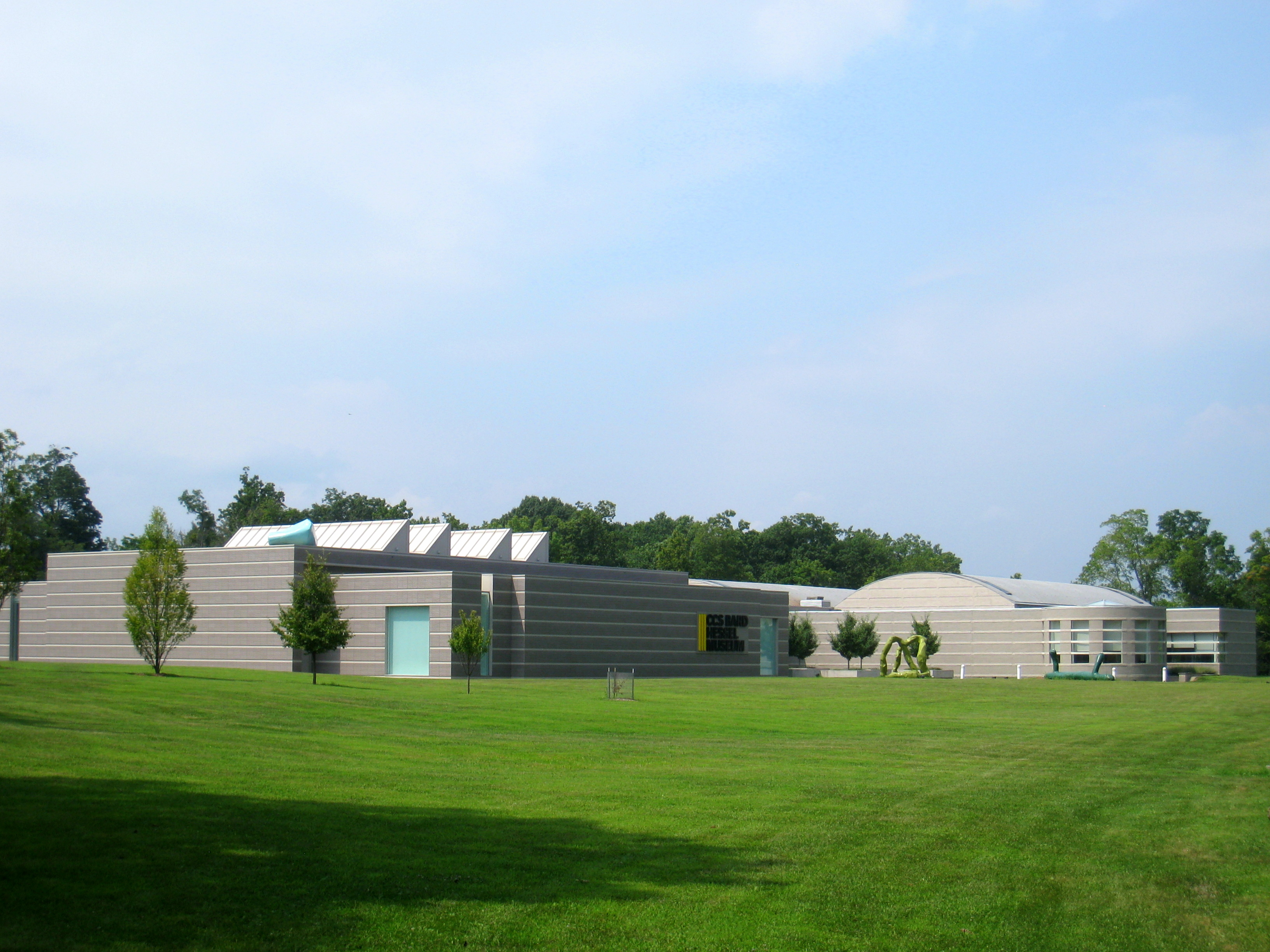
Center for Curatorial Studies and Art in Contemporary Culture

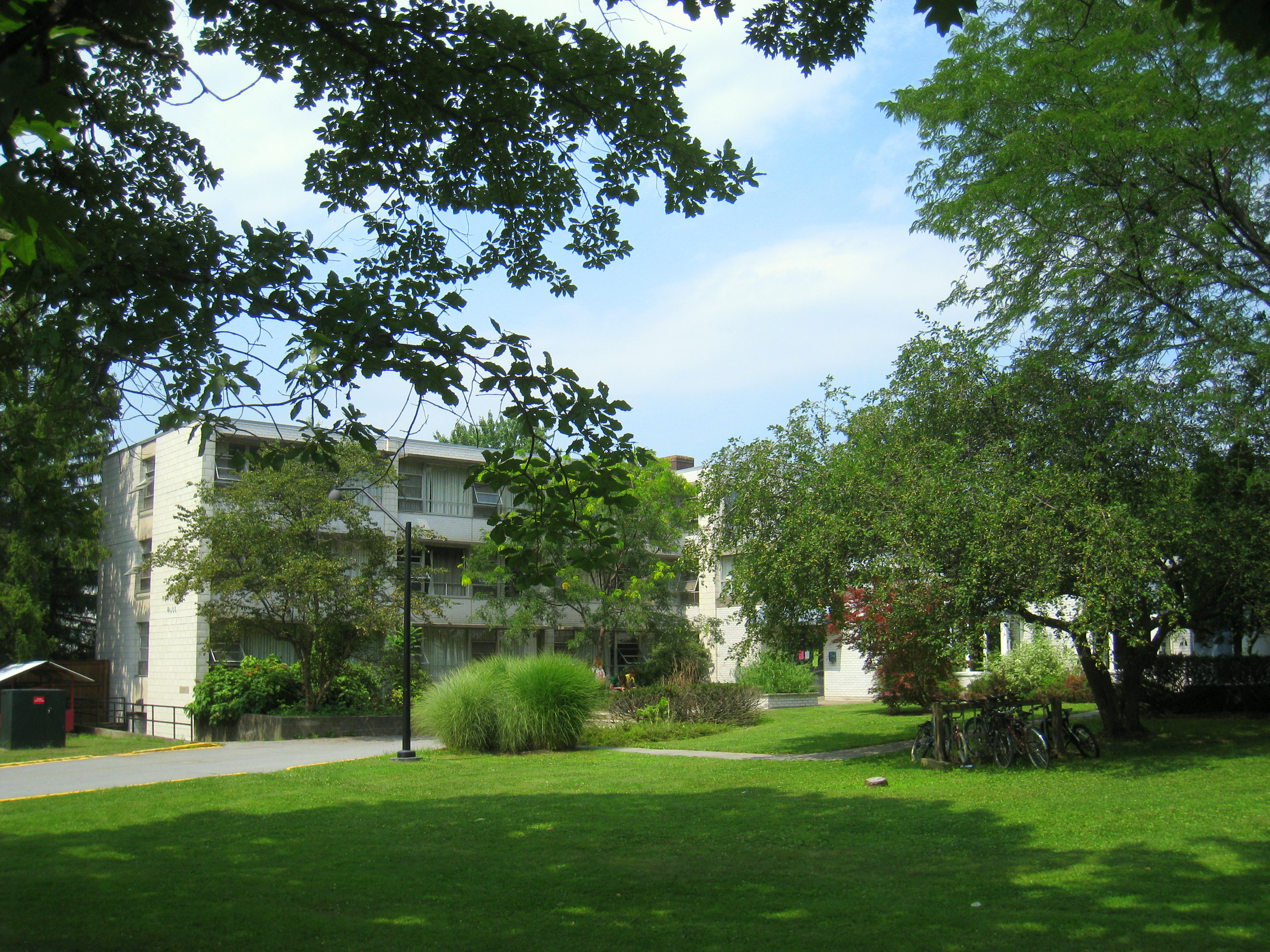
Tewksbury Hall, dormitory

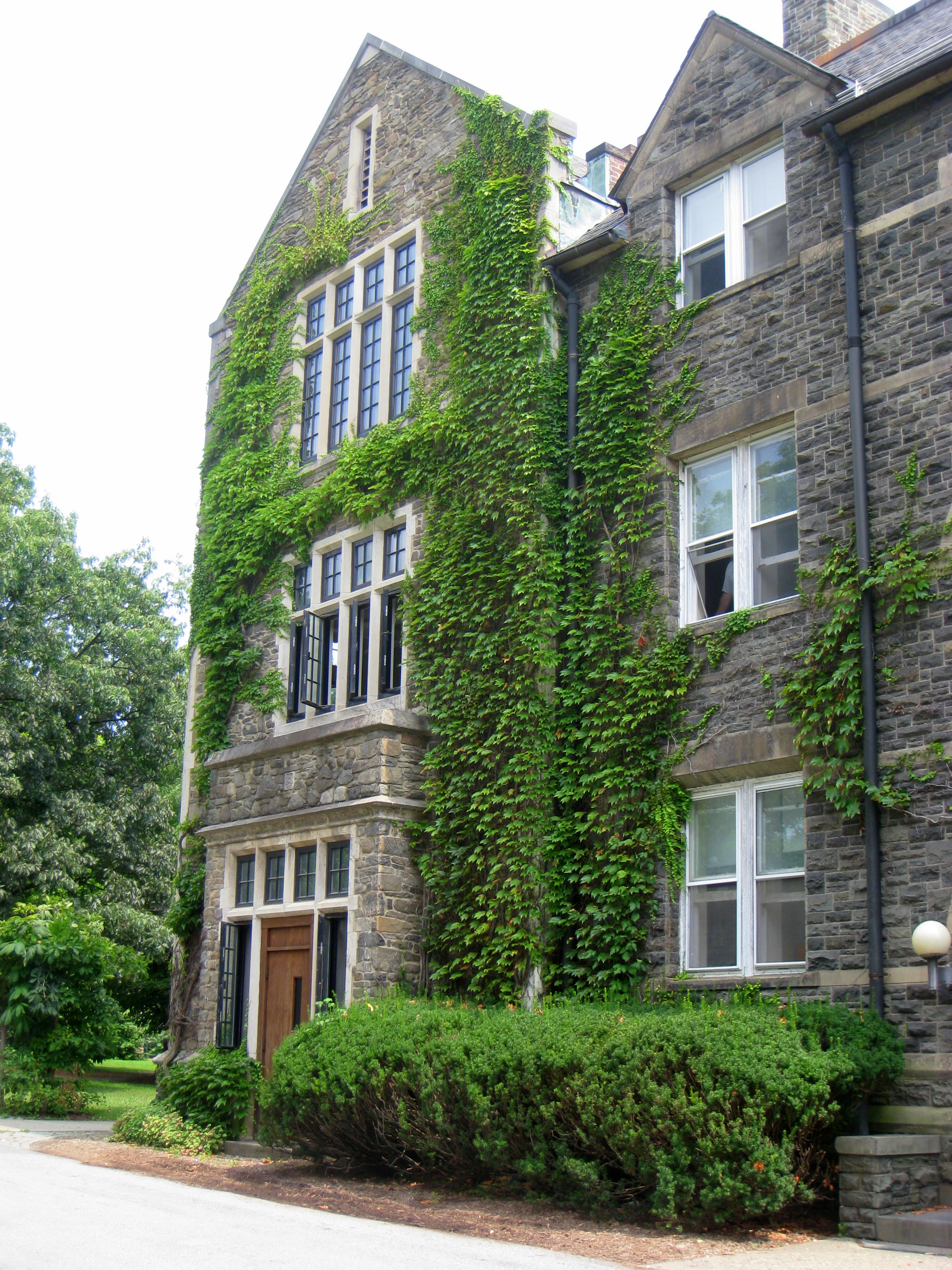
Hegeman

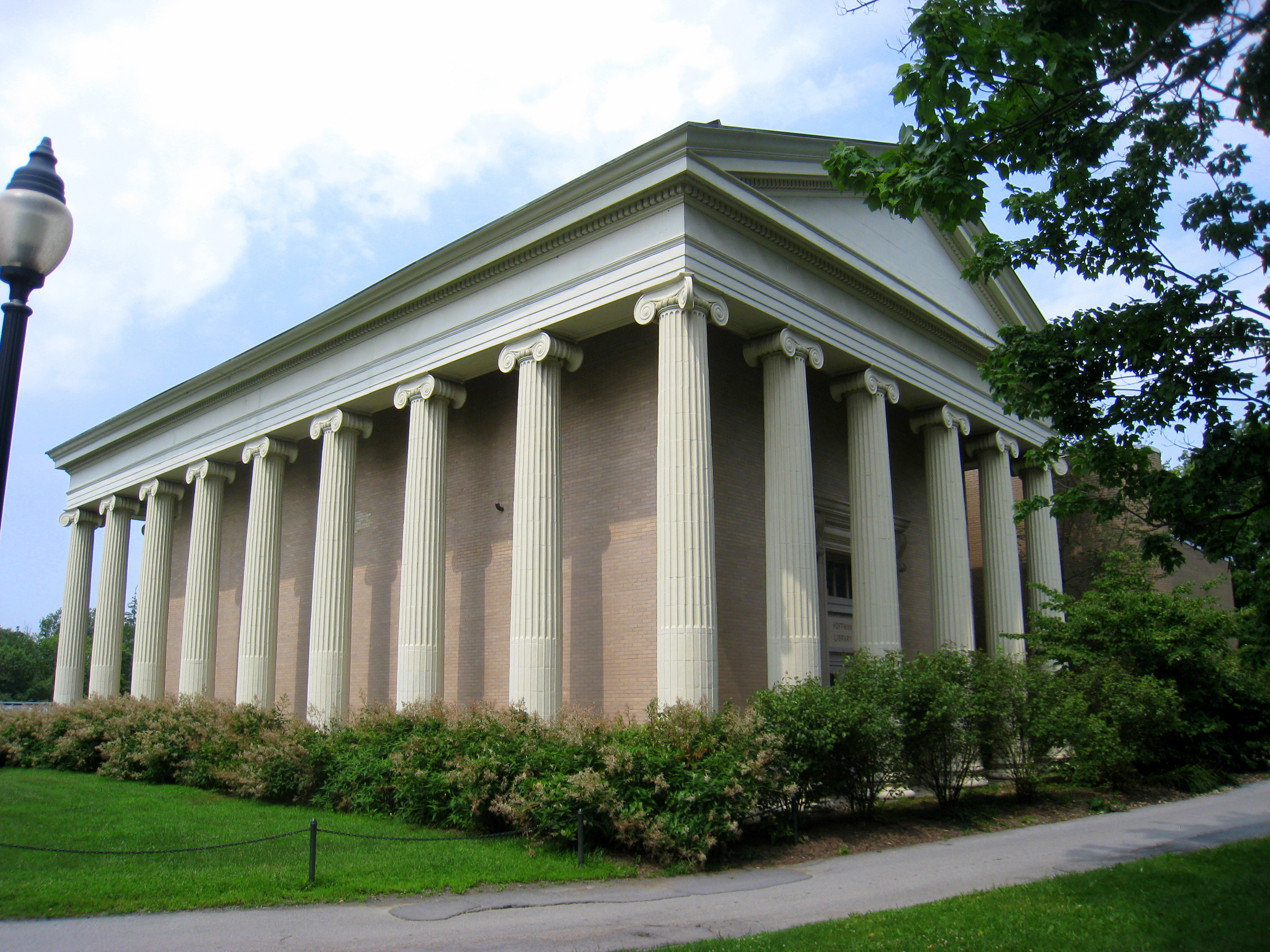
Hoffman Library
