= James Hooker (New York politician) =

American judge and politician (1792–1858)

- Born: July 12, 1792; Windsor, Connecticut, U.S.
- Died: September 2, 1858 (aged 66); Poughkeepsie, New York, U.S.
- Education: Yale College; Litchfield Law School
- Spouse: Helen Sarah Reade
- Children: 2
- Parent(s): James Hooker; Mary Chaffee
- Relatives: James Hooker Hamersley (grandson)

James Hooker (July 12, 1792 – September 2, 1858) was an American lawyer and politician from New York.

== Early life ==
Hooker was born in Windsor, Hartford County, Connecticut, on July 12, 1792. He was the son of Captain James Hooker (1742–1805), a merchant, and his third wife, Mary (née Chaffee) Hooker.

Hooker graduated from Yale College in 1810, and then studied law at the Litchfield Law School.

== Career ==
He was Surrogate of Dutchess County from 1828 to 1840. In 1836, he was a presidential elector. In February 1840, he was elected by the New York State Legislature one of the canal commissioners and was legislated out of office by the Act of May 6, 1844, which re-organized the Canal Commission.

== Personal life ==
Hooker married Helen Sarah Reade (1790–1879), the daughter of John Reade (1745–1808) and Catherine Livingston Reade (1756–1829). Together, they had two daughters, including:

- Catherine Livingston Hooker (1817–1867), who married Col. John William Hamersley (1808–1889).

Hooker died in 1858 in Poughkeepsie, Dutchess County, New York.

=== Descendants ===
Through his daughter Catherine, he was the grandfather of James Hooker Hamersley (1844–1901), Helen Reade Hamersley (1849–1911), who married Charles Dickinson Stickney (1858–1916), and Catherine Livingston Hamersley (1850–1873), who married John Henry Livingston (1848–1927).
