= Catherine Livingston Hamersley =

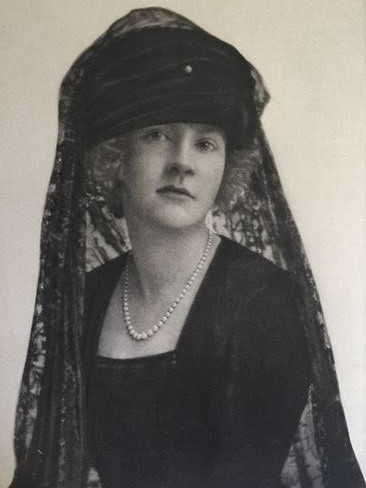
Catherine Livingston Hamersley

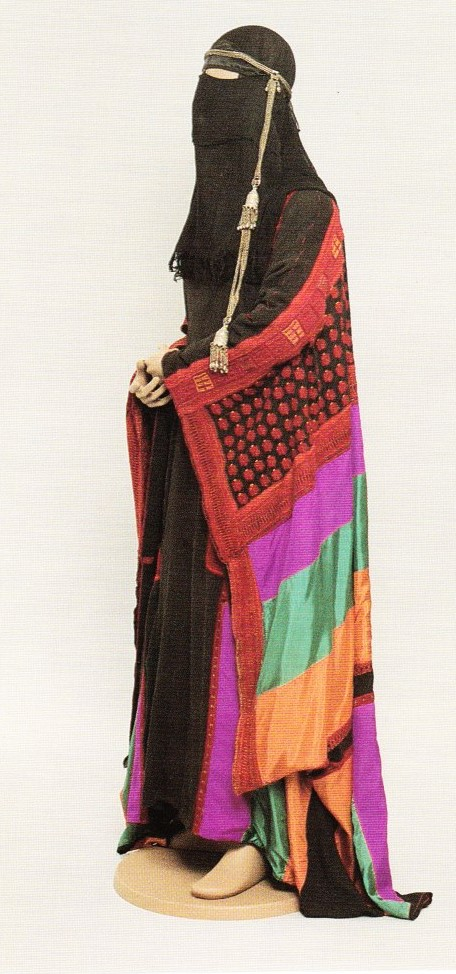
Traditional Najd Woman's Dress

Catherine Livingston Hamersley (8 May 1891 – 23 November 1977) was a New York City, Newport, and Palm Beach philanthropist and society figure, and the first American woman to visit the Najd city of Riyadh, capital of the new state of Saudi Arabia, in 1939. Her other travels included early 20th century visits to Timbuktu, Mali, and she witnessed the 1937 volcano at Rabaul, New Guinea. In 1939 she was elected as a Fellow of the Royal Geographical Society.

== Life and landmark Arabian travel ==
Catherine Hamersley was born in Manhattan, the daughter of J. Hooker Hamersley, a well-known mogul of the Gilded Age, and Margaret Willing Chisholm. With the death of her father, in 1901, and her mother, in 1904, the orphaned Catherine and her brother, Louis Gordon Hamersley (1892-1942), known as Gordon, were raised by their nanny, Sarah Lowrie at their parents' house at 1030 Fifth Avenue. They inherited over $1.5 million from their parents. Gordon, under the terms of a will left by his cousin Louis Carré Hamersley, inherited an additional $7 million estate. Through these inheritances, Catherine and Gordon owned much of today's Fifth Avenue area properties between Washington Square North and Madison Square Park in New York City, purchased by their 2nd great-grandfather, Andrew Hamersley, in the late 18th century.

Catherine and Gordon were known in the early 1900s as "the Hamersley Twins" and were the subject of newspaper articles, fiction, (The Danger Mark, by Robert Chambers), and a Hollywood film. A court case contesting their cousin's will involved his wife, Lily Spencer-Churchill, Duchess of Marlborough, (who had spent the income from her late husband Louis Carré's trust on improving Blenheim palace), and several Hamersley relations. The validity of the will was upheld in two lengthy, contentious, and highly publicized trials in New York State Courts, in which both Catherine and Gordon were prominently featured, and Gordon received the bulk of the estate.

Catherine married Samuel Neilson Hinckley (1881-1931) in October 1914, and their son Samuel Neilson Hinckley Jr. was born in September 1915. In 1922, Catherine divorced Hinckley to marry Henry Coleman Drayton (1883-1942), a grandson of William Backhouse Astor Jr., and in 1929 she divorced Drayton and married Charles Whitney Carpenter (1884-1954).

It was while married to Carpenter that Catherine Hamersley became well known as a Mid East traveler. Her grandfather, John William Hamersley, was famous for having been one of the first Americans to have met Mohamed Ali Pasha, the founder of modern Egypt in 1834 during an extensive trip through the Middle East. Inspired by his travels, and a 1912 trip she had made to Egypt, Catherine's January 1939 travel to Syria, Iraq, and Central Arabia became a landmark trip: the first American woman to enter Riyadh. Until Catherine's visit, the only recorded visits of “foreign” women who had been allowed access to the al Saud capital were:

- Princess Alice, Countess of Athlone, of the United Kingdom, in February 1938, by invitation from then Crown Prince Saud of Saudi Arabia, who had met her in 1936 at Ascot
- Geraldine Rendel, along with her husband, a British diplomat, interested in seeing the Eastern Arabian oil fields from her Kuwaiti base, in 1937
- Violet Dickson, who accompanied her husband, a retired British Political Agent in Kuwait, also in 1937

The visits of these women, and by Catherine Hamersley were possible due to the consolidation of the Arabian regions by King Abdulaziz al Saud (“ibn Saud”) in 1932, and they were landmark trips to the heart of the Wahabi Islamic sect, an event where there had been a goal they never achieved, by the intrepid British explorer and diplomat Gertrude Bell.

During her Riyadh visit Catherine captured photographic images including those of the King, the Crown Prince, and royal advisor Yusuf Yasin of Syria. Catherine herself was photographed in Riyadh wearing traditional Najdi woman's garb. Later, following the trip, both Catherine and her husband Carpenter gave an interview to Lowell Thomas, on his “Order of Adventurers” Radio program.

In 1939 the United States had no diplomatic representation in Saudi Arabia; any American in the Kingdom was likely working in the Eastern Coastal area of Dhahran, the center of emerging Saudi oil production beginning in 1938. Both the West Arabian coastal city of Jeddah, and the Eastern Coast area were visited by western women. But the al Saud capital of Riyadh and the central Arabian Najd region were off-limits to western women except by special permission from the royal court.

Remarkably, Catherine commented upon her return from her visit that she had not only stayed in the King's new palace, but had been included in a falcon-hunting trip with King Abdulaziz; some of her photographs show the camp and the falcons used for hunting. The inclusion of a western woman on a royal hunting trip has not been recorded until her visit.

While she is often remembered as an East Coast American society heiress and hostess, her status as the first American woman to visit Riyadh was notable, and her photographs of the trip are held in the Litchfield, Connecticut Historical Society collection, and they provide a record of pre-WWII Saudi Arabia history.
