= Hammersley =

Hammersley is a surname. Notable people with the surname include:

- Ben Hammersley (born 1976), British photojournalist
- Charles E. Hammersley (died 1957), American politician
- Frederick Hammersley (1824–1901), Major-General and the first Inspector of Gymnasia in the British Army
- Frederick Hammersley (1858-1924), British Army officer, commanded the Landing at Suvla Bay by his division during the Gallipoli Campaign
- Frederick Hammersley (1919–2009), American abstract painter
- James Astbury Hammersley (1815–1869), English painter, and teacher of art and design
- John Hammersley (1920–2004), British mathematician
- Martyn Hammersley (born 1949), British sociologist
- Peter Hammersley (1928–2020), British admiral
- Rachel Hammersley (born 1974), British historian
- Reuben Hammersley (1897–1940), English World War I flying ace
- Rodolfo Hammersley (born 1889, date of death unknown), Chilean track and field athlete
- Samuel Hammersley (1892–1965), Conservative Party politician in England
- William Hammersley (1826–1886), sports journalist in Australia

== Other uses ==
- Hammersley Inlet, part of Puget Sound in Washington, USA
- Hammersley Wild Area, in Pennsylvania, USA
- Hammersley Fork, also in Pennsylvania, USA

== See also ==
- Hamersley (disambiguation)
- Hämmerli, a European manufacturer of firearms
