= Lord Beresford =

Lord Beresford may refer to:

- William Beresford, 1st Viscount Beresford (1768–1854), British soldier, Governor of Jersey
- Lord William Beresford (1847–1900), Irish soldier and holder of the Victoria Cross
- Charles Beresford, 1st Baron Beresford (1846–1919), better known as Lord Charles Beresford, British naval commander and politician, great-nephew of the 1st Viscount
