= Cicero Price =

United States Navy admiral

- Born: 2 December 1805; Lancaster, Kentucky, US
- Died: 24 November 1888 (aged 82); Troy, New York, US
- Burial place: Oakwood Cemetery, Troy, New York
- Relatives: George Spencer-Churchill, 8th Duke of Marlborough (son-in-law)
- Military career
- Allegiance: United States of America
- Branch: United States Navy
- Service years: 1826–1867
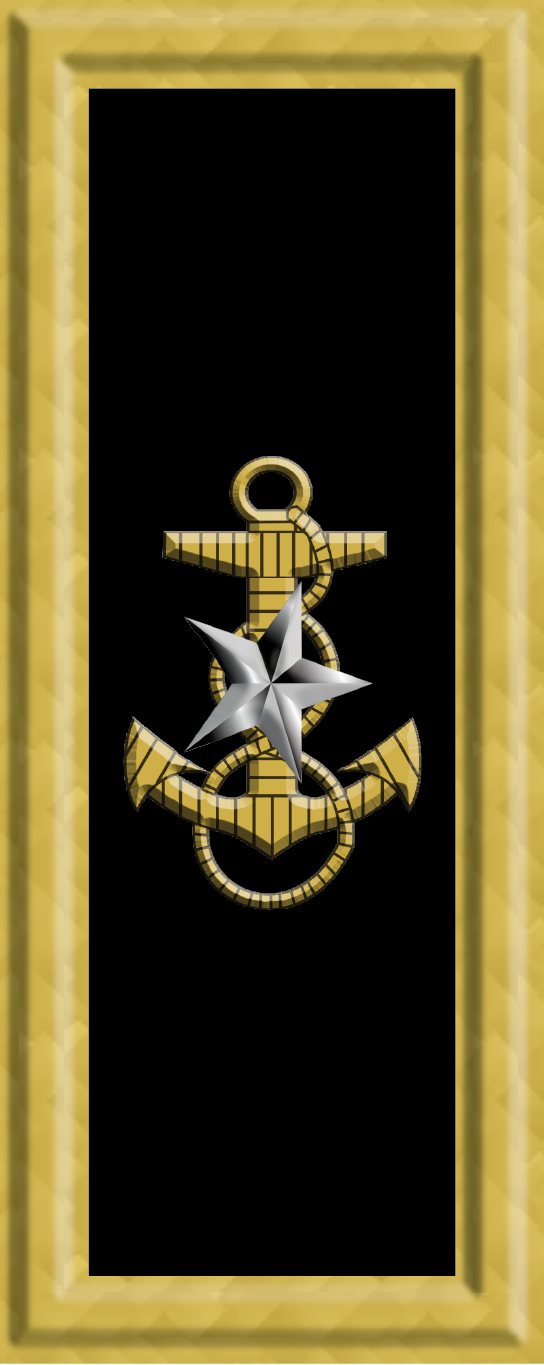
- Rank: Commodore
- Commands: USS Huntsville; USS Jamestown; East India Squadron
- Conflicts: African Slave Trade Patrol; American Civil War; Union blockade

Commodore Cicero Price (2 December 1805 – 24 November 1888) was an officer in the United States Navy. He served in the American Civil War and was commander of the East India Squadron.

== Naval career ==
Price was born in Lancaster, Kentucky, on 2 December 1805. He was appointed a midshipman from Kentucky on 1 February 1826 and was attached to the frigate USS Macedonian in the Brazil Squadron from 1826 to 1828 and to the sloop-of-war USS Erie and the schooner USS Shark in the West Indies Squadron during periods between 1828 and 1831. He was promoted to passed midshipman on 28 April 1832.

Price served aboard the schooner USS Boxer from 1834 to 1837 and on the ship-of-the-line USS North Carolina in the Pacific Squadron from 1837 to 1838, and was promoted to lieutenant on 6 September 1837. He next had duty aboard the sidewheel steamer USS Fulton along the United States East Coast in 1840 and aboard the ship-of-the-line USS Delaware in the Brazil Squadron and the Mediterranean Squadron from 1841 to 1843 and during part of 1844. He was assigned to a receiving ship at the New York Navy Yard in Brooklyn, New York, during 1845 and to the sloop-of-war USS Marion in the Africa Squadron during 1846. He was aboard Marion again in 1848 and 1849 while she was in the Mediterranean Squadron.

After duty at the Memphis Navy Yard in Memphis, Tennessee, in 1850, Price served on the staff of the Pacific Squadron in 1851, was on ordnance duty during 1853, and was assigned to the receiving ship at Norfolk Navy Yard in Portsmouth, Virginia, in 1854. Promoted to commander on 14 September 1855, he was first lieutenant aboard the sloop-of-war USS Constellation in the Mediterranean Squadron during parts of 1855 and 1856.

After the American Civil War broke out in April 1861, Price was commanding officer of the steamer USS Huntsville in the Gulf Blockading Squadron in the Gulf of Mexico, taking part in the Union blockade of the Confederate States of America. Promoted to captain on 16 July 1862, he was commanding officer of the sloop-of-war USS Jamestown from 1862 to 1865, serving also as commander of the East India Squadron from 23 September 1862 to 11 August 1865, engaged in the protection of American commerce from Confederate privateers in East Asia and the Western Pacific through the end of the war in April 1865.

Promoted to commodore on 28 September or 29 December 1866 (sources vary), Price retired from the Navy on 2 December 1867 upon reaching the statutory retirement age of 62.

== Personal life ==
Price was married to the former Elizabeth Homer Paine (1828–1910). They had a son and three daughters, Lilian Warren Price Hammersley (1854–1909), Lucy Price Renshaw (1858–1896), and Cora Elizabeth Price (1857–1875).

After the death of her first husband, the New York real-estate millionaire Louis Carré Hamersley, Lilian became the Duchess of Marlborough, marrying George Spencer-Churchill, 8th Duke of Marlborough, about five months before Price's death.

== Death ==
After a few days of illness, Price died of pleuropneumonia in Troy on the evening of 24 November 1888.

== Notes ==
Military offices
Preceded by Frederick K. Engle	Commander, East India Squadron; 23 September 1862–11 August 1865	Succeeded by Henry H. Bell
