= USS Huntsville (1857) =

Gunboat of the United States Navy 1861–1865

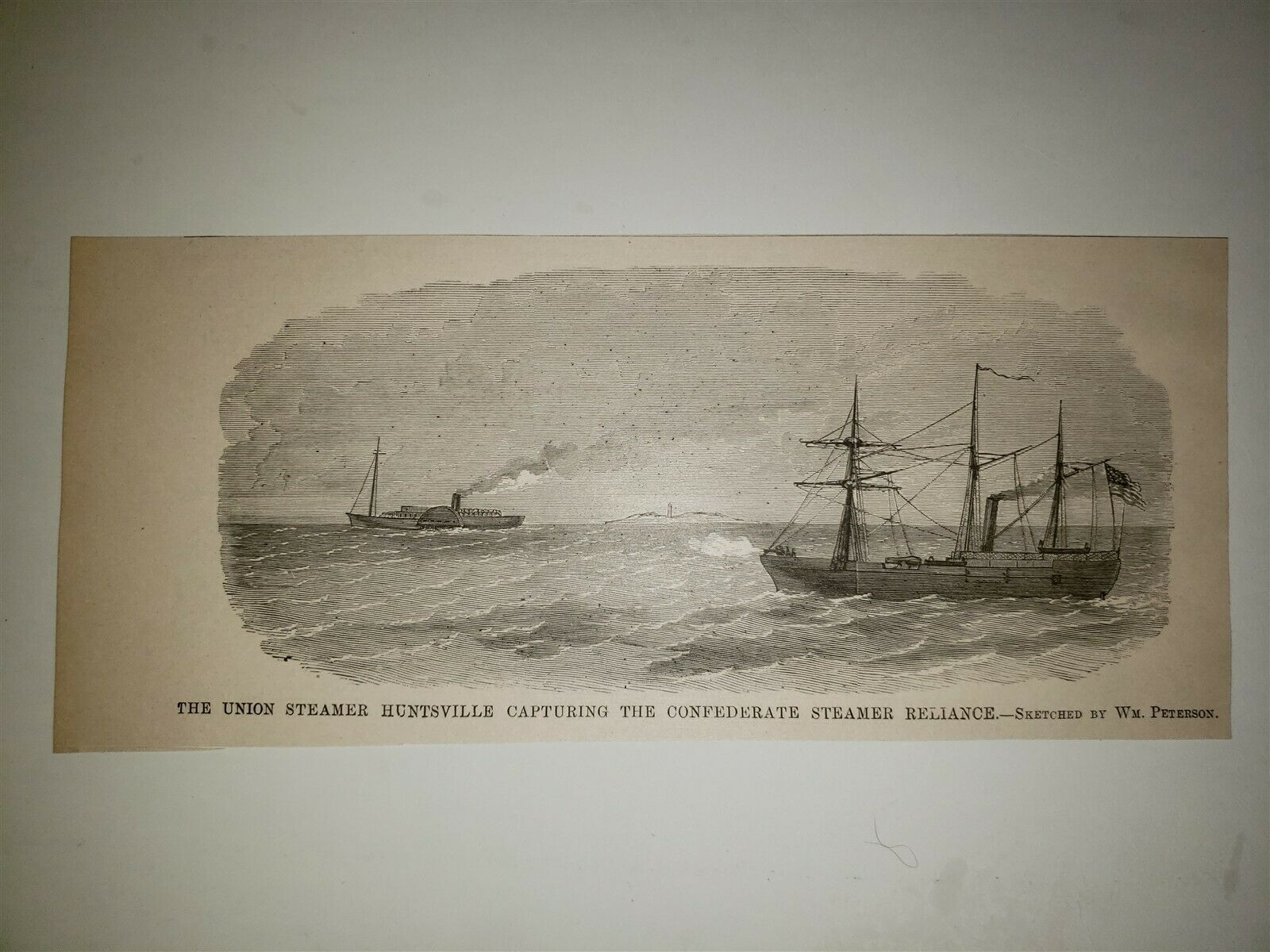
- USS Huntsville chases the rebel steamer CSS Reliance.

History

United States
- Name: SS Huntsville
- Namesake: Huntsville, Alabama; Huntsville, Texas
- Owner: H. B. Cromwell & Co.
- Operator: H. B. Cromwell & Co.
- Builder: J. A. Westervelt (New York)
- Launched: 10 December 1857
- Completed: January 1858
- In service: January 1858
- Out of service: April 1861
- Fate: Chartered by U.S. Navy 24 April 1861; Sold to U.S. Navy 24 August 1861

United States
- Name: USS Huntsville
- Namesake: Previous name retained
- Operator: United States Navy
- Acquired: 24 April 1861
- Commissioned: 9 May 1861
- Decommissioned: 5 April 1862
- Recommissioned: 11 June 1862
- Decommissioned: 19 August 1864
- Recommissioned: 25 March 1865
- Decommissioned: 28 August 1865
- Fate: Sold 30 November 1865

United States
- Name: SS Huntsville
- Namesake: Previous name retained
- Owner: Russell Sturgis
- In service: 1865
- Out of service: 1877

General characteristics
- Displacement: 860 tons
- Length: 196 ft 4 in (59.84 m)
- Beam: 29 ft 6 in (8.99 m)
- Draft: 19 ft 5 in (5.92 m)
- Propulsion: steam engine; screw-propelled
- Speed: 11 knots
- Complement: 64
- Armament: one 64-pounder gun; two 32-pounder guns

USS Huntsville was a steamer acquired by the United States Navy for service during the American Civil War. She was in commission during three different periods between 1861 and 1865, operating as part of the Union blockade of the Confederate States of America.

== Construction and commercial service ==
Huntsville, a wooden screw steamer, was built in New York City by J. A. Westervelt for H. B. Cromwell & Co., who intended to run her as a passenger steamer between New York and Savannah, Georgia. Huntsville was launched on 10 December 1857, and was in operation on her intended route by January of the following year.

== United States Navy service ==
=== Acquisition ===
With the outbreak of the American Civil War in April 1861, the United States Navy chartered Huntsville from H. B. Cromwell & Co. in New York City on 24 April 1861 and commissioned her there as USS Huntsville on 9 May 1861 with Commander Cicero Price in command. The U.S. Navy purchased her on 24 August 1861.

=== 1861–1862 ===
After commissioning, Huntsville departed New York City for Key West, Florida, arriving there on 11 May 1861, and joined the Gulf Blockading Squadron to take part in the Union blockade of the Confederate States of America. In early August 1861 she steamed from the Florida coast westward and almost immediately captured two small schooners off Mobile, Alabama. She cruised on blockade duty from Alabama to Texas, and on 24 December 1861 she engaged the Confederate States Navy gunboat CSS Florida off Mobile Bay. Following an hour-long gun battle, she turned the Florida back into Mobile. Huntsville returned to New York City in the spring of 1862, and she was decommissioned there on 5 April 1862.

=== 1862–1864 ===
Huntsville was recommissioned at New York City on 11 June 1862 with Lieutenant Howard Rogers in command, and returned to blockade duty along the Gulf Coast of the United States. By the end of July 1862 she had taken three prizes, the Confederate steamers Adela and Reliance and the British schooner Agnes, carrying cargoes of cotton, rosin, and other commodities. Before the end of 1862, she captured two additional blockade runners, the schooners Courier and Ariel, trying to run into Mobile with cargoes of lead, tin, medicines, wine, and coffee.

During 1863, Huntsville captured two Confederate ships, Minnie and A. J. Hodge; two British schooners, Surprise and Ascension; and the Spanish steamer Union. In addition, she drove two other ships, Cuba and Eugenia, into the hands of other ships in the blockading squadron and was given partial credit in the capture of Last Trial, a Confederate sloop captured off the harbor at Key West. Among the variety of cargo seized, Huntsville captured 523 bales of cotton and prevented a great quantity of supplies, mainly from Havana, Cuba, and Nassau in the Bahamas, from reaching the Confederacy.

During the first part of 1864 Huntsville operated along the coast of Florida and off Cuba. Late in May 1864 she moved to Tampa Bay on the west coast of Florida to support landing forces. An outbreak of yellow fever in near-epidemic proportions struck the U.S. ships, and Huntsville was one of the hardest hit, the disease striking more than half her crew. Departing Tampa, Florida, on 23 July 1864, she coaled at Key West and reached New York City on 3 August 1864. Following a period of quarantine, she decommissioned on 19 August 1864.

=== 1865 ===
Huntsville recommissioned on 25 March 1865 with Lieutenant Commander Edward F. Devens in command. Departing New York City on 2 April 1865, she stopped at Mobile before arriving at New Orleans, Louisiana, on 17 April 1865. There she embarked passengers and prisoners of war and steamed back to the New York City area, arriving at the New York Navy Yard in Brooklyn, New York, on 1 May 1865. She got back underway on 14 May 1865, stopped at Baltimore, Maryland, to embark 150 men bound for Panama (then a part of Colombia), and arrived at Aspinwall, Panama, on 30 May 1865. Departing Aspinwall on 5 June 1865, she discovered survivors of the wrecked steamer Golden Rule on Roncador Cay. With the aid of the gunboat USS State of Georgia, she rescued the survivors and carried them to Aspinwall. She departed again on 16 June 1865 with 85 members of Golden Rule′s crew embarked and arrived at New York City on 25 June 1865.

After completing two passenger runs to Boston, Massachusetts, Huntsville escorted the monitor USS Nausett to Philadelphia, Pennsylvania, arriving there on 22 August 1865. She decommissioned there on 28 August 1865 and was sold at New York City on 30 November 1865 to Russell Sturgis.
