= Michael Hamersley =

American whistleblower

Michael C. Hamersley
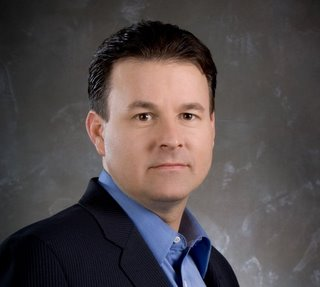
- Education: Georgetown University Law Center (JD), 1995; Florida International University (BBA/MBA)
- Occupation: Tax attorney
- Employer: Hamersley Partners
- Known for: Corporate whistleblower against KPMG in 2003
- Political party: Democrat

Michael Hamersley is a tax lawyer who, in 2003, became a corporate whistleblower against the accounting firm KPMG's tax shelter fraud. In 2006 he was a candidate for the U.S. Congress in California's 4th congressional district, obtaining third place in the Democratic party primary. Hamersley worked in the Legal Division of California's Franchise Tax Board, as a member of its Abusive Tax Shelter Task Force, from 2004 through 2009.

== Background ==
Hamersley graduated from Georgetown University Law Center in Washington, D.C. in 1995, where he earned a J.D. degree. Prior to attending law school, Hamersley earned Bachelor of Business Administration and MBA degrees from Florida International University.

== KPMG Whistleblower ==
Hamersley first worked for KPMG in 1998 in the Mergers and Acquisitions Group of its Washington National Tax office. He relocated to KPMG's downtown Los Angeles office in March 2000. In June 2003, Hamersley filed a whistleblower lawsuit against KPMG in Los Angeles Superior Court.

On October 21, 2003, Hamersely testified before the United States Senate Committee on Finance outlining KPMG's abuse of tax shelters, describing the firm's active role in developing improper tax shelters, and noting that tax professionals who participated in the abuse were rewarded by the firm. KPMG categorically denied Hamersley's allegations stating that the conclusions in his Senate Finance Committee testimony are "simply wrong."

Hamersley assisted the United States Senate Homeland Security Permanent Subcommittee on Investigations in its examination of the KPMG tax shelters, which culminated in a two-day hearing and a voluminous report detailing the nature of the KPMG's tax shelter activities. A total of nineteen senior executives of KPMG were indicted on criminal conspiracy and tax evasion charges in what the U.S. Department of Justice referred to as "the largest criminal tax case in U.S. history."

KPMG subsequently admitted criminal wrongdoing relating to abusive tax shelter activities and entered into a deferred prosecution agreement with the U.S. Department of Justice pursuant to which KPMG paid $456 million in fines, restitution, and penalties. Several of KPMG's tax shelter clients also sued KPMG as a result of their tax liability exposure.

The February 2004 PBS Frontline documentary "Tax Me If You Can" about abusive tax shelters included interviews with Hamersley. His KPMG experience appears as a case study in the Legal Ethics: Law Stories textbook. See Chapter 3: Travails in Tax, KPMG and the Tax Shelter Controversy.

== California Franchise Tax Board ==
Hamersley joined the Abusive Tax Shelter Task Force in the Legal Department of California's Franchise Tax Board in 2004. He has since lectured at tax seminars and professional ethics lectures at Georgetown University Law Center. In July 2009, Hamersley left the California Franchise Tax Board to head up Hamersley Partners, a tax consulting firm.

== U.S. Congressional campaign ==
In June 2006 he was a candidate for the U.S. Congress in California's 4th congressional district, obtaining third place in the Democratic party primary with 20.1% of the vote. He ran against Democrats Charles Brown and Lisa Rae. Brown went on to lose to then-incumbent Republican John Doolittle.

Hamersley ran on a campaign of reform, seeking to tie Rep. Doolittle to disgraced politicians and lobbyists such as Duke Cunningham and Jack Abramoff, and generally accusing Doolittle of participating in "pay-to-play politics". Doolittle did not seek reelection in 2008 after his home was raided by the FBI in an alleged political corruption investigation.
