= J. Hooker Hamersley =

American heir, lawyer and poet from New York City

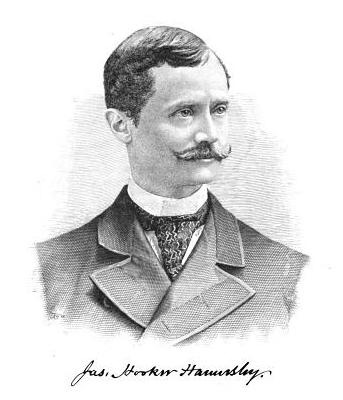
- Born: James Hooker Hamersley; January 26, 1844; New York City, New York, U.S.
- Died: September 15, 1901 (aged 57); Garrison-on-Hudson, New York, U.S.
- Education: Columbia University; Columbia Law School
- Occupations: Lawyer, poet
- Spouse: Margaret Willing Chisolm (m. 1888)
- Children: 3, including Louis
- Parent(s): John William Hamersley; Catherine Livingston Hooker
- Relatives: James Hooker (grandfather); Charles Stickney (brother-in-law); John H. Livingston (brother-in-law)

James Hooker Hamersley (January 26, 1844 – September 15, 1901) was an American heir, lawyer and poet from New York City during the Gilded Age.

== Early life ==
James Hooker Hamersley was born in New York City on January 26, 1844. He was the son of Col. John William Hamersley (1808–1889) and his wife, born Catherine Livingston Hooker (1817–1867). His siblings included Helen Reade Hamersley, who married Charles Dickinson Stickney, a New York City lawyer and banker; Virginia Hamersley, who married Cortlandt de Peyster Field (son of Benjamin Hazard Field); and Catherine Livingston Hamersley, who married John Henry Livingston. (Note: John Henry Livingston (1848–1927) was a grandson of Edward Philip Livingston, a Lt. Gov. of New York, and a first cousin of Thomas S. Clarkson, namesake of Clarkson University, Goodhue Livingston, noted architect, and Mary Livingston Ludlow, the mother of Anna Hall Roosevelt and grandmother of First Lady Eleanor Roosevelt.)

His paternal grandparents were Elizabeth (née Finney) Hamersley and Lewis Carré Hamersley, himself a grandson of William Hamersley, who emigrated to America in 1700. (Note: William Hamersley (1687–1752), the grandfather of James' grandfather, Lewis Carré Hamersley (1767–1853), was himself a great-grandson of Sir Hugh Hamersley (1565–1636), a 17th-century merchant who was Lord Mayor of London in 1627. William married Lucretia Grevenraet (granddaughter of Johannes Pieterse van Brugh) in New York.) Hamersley was also a cousin of Louis Carré Hamersley, the first husband of Lilian Warren Price, later Duchess of Marlborough. His maternal grandparents were James Hooker, a Yale graduate and Erie Canal Commissioner, and Helen Sarah (née Reade) Hooker. Through this grandmother, Hamersley was a fifth-generation descendant of Robert Livingston the Elder, the Scottish immigrant who was granted the Livingston Manor by royal charter. Thomas Gordon, a Scottish immigrant who became a judge in New Jersey, was another fifth-generation ancestor.

Hamersley graduated from Columbia University in 1865, and from the Columbia Law School in 1867.

== Career ==
Hamersley was affiliated with the law office of James W. Gerard, and practiced law for ten years. He then withdrew from active practice to manage his, and his family's property. He was nominated for the New York State Assembly, but withdrew in favor of William Waldorf Astor.

Hamersley published The Seven Voices, a volume of poetry, in 1898.

== Personal life ==
Hamersley was one of Edith Kermit Carow Roosevelt's boyfriends. Later on April 30, 1888, he married Margaret Willing Chisolm (1863–1904), daughter of William Edings Chisolm and his wife, née Mary Ann Rogers, a niece of William Augustus Muhlenberg. They had three children:

- Margaret Rogers Hamersley (1889–1891), who died in infancy.
- Catherine Livingston Hamersley (b. 1891), who married Samuel Neilson Hinckley (1882–1931) in 1914. They divorced in 1921 and she married Henry Coleman Drayton (1887–1942), a grandson of William Backhouse Astor Jr. in 1922. She later married Charles Whitney Carpenter Jr.
- Louis Gordon Hamersley (1892–1942), who was ultimately the sole beneficiary of a trust established by James' cousin, Louis Carré Hamersley.

Hamersley died at his country estate, "Brookhurst," on September 15, 1901, at Garrison-on-Hudson, New York. His funeral was held at Grace Church in Manhattan and he was buried at Trinity Church Cemetery. His wife died a few years later on January 5, 1904, in her home at 1030 Fifth Avenue in New York City.
