= Lily Spencer-Churchill, Duchess of Marlborough =

American heiress and socialite

Her Grace The Duchess of Marlborough
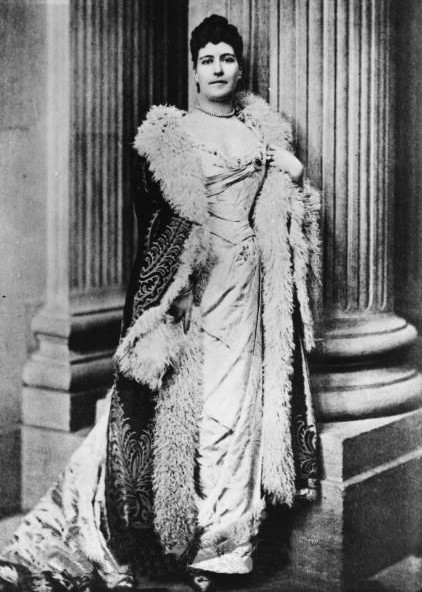
- Lily Spencer-Churchill, Duchess of Marlborough
- Born: Lilian Warren Price; June 10, 1854; Troy, New York, US
- Died: January 11, 1909 (aged 54); Hove, East Sussex, England
- Education: Emma Willard School
- Title: Duchess of Marlborough
- Spouses: Louis Carré Hamersley (died 1883) George Spencer-Churchill, 8th Duke of Marlborough (m. 1888; died 1892) Lord William Beresford (m. 1895; died 1900)
- Children: William Warren de la Poer Beresford
- Parents: Cicero Price (father); Elizabeth Homer Paine (mother)

Lily, Lady William Beresford, formerly Lily Spencer-Churchill, Duchess of Marlborough (née Price, June 10, 1854 – January 11, 1909) was an American heiress and socialite during the Gilded Age.

== Early life ==
Lilian Warren Price was born on June 10, 1854, in Troy, New York. Her father was Commodore Cicero Price (1805–1888), an officer in the United States Navy who served in the American Civil War and was Commander of the East India Squadron, and her mother, Elizabeth Homer Paine (1828–1910). She attended Emma Willard School in Troy, New York.

== Marriages ==
Her first marriage was to Louis Carré Hamersley, a millionaire heir to a real estate fortune in New York City, who died in 1883 and was buried in the Trinity Church Cemetery. As stipulated in his will, the bulk of his estate went to the first male child of his cousin, J. Hooker Hamersley, whose estate in turn went to his son, Louis Gordon Hamersley. However, she was guaranteed to receive an annual income of US$150,000 from the estate.

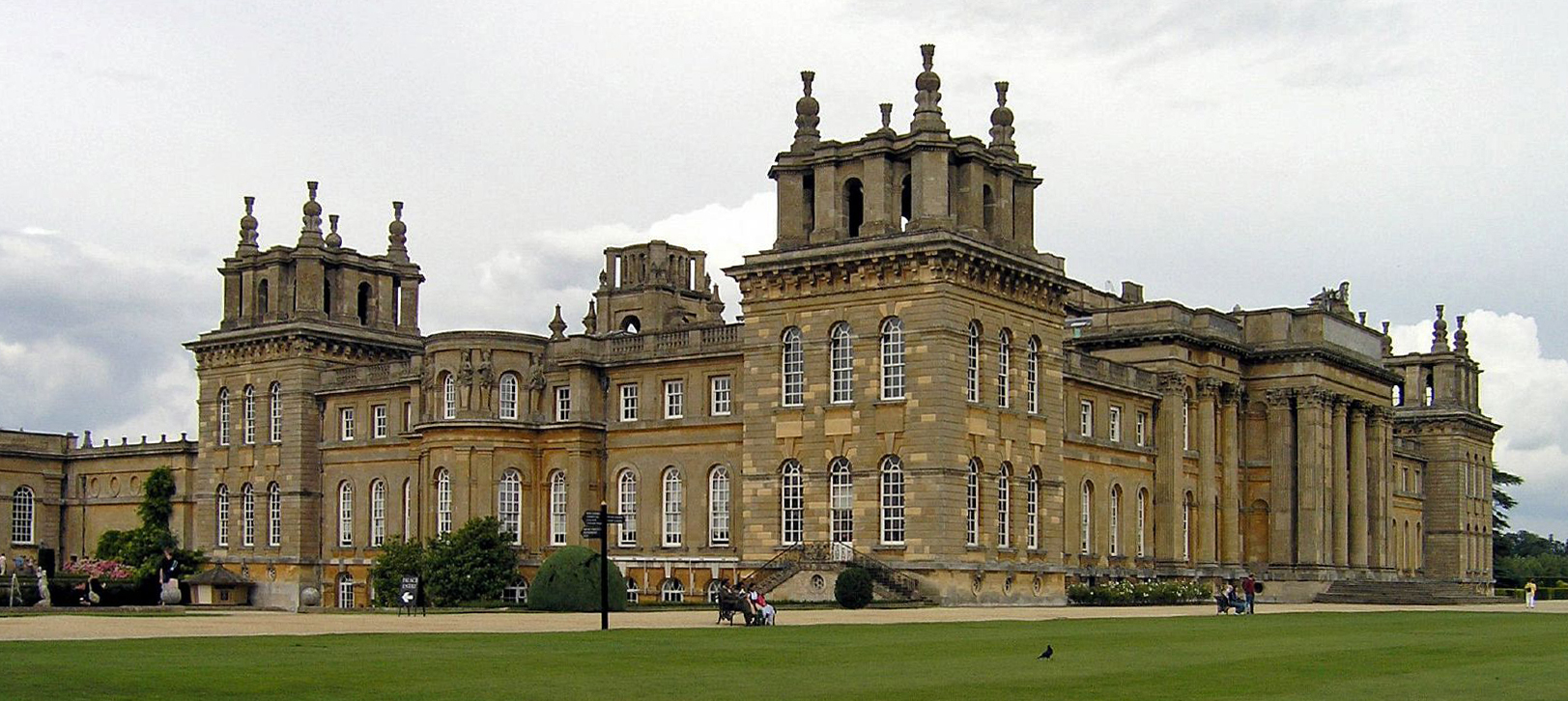
Blenheim Palace, which Lily helped restore with her inheritance. She later sued her stepson to be repaid.

=== Second marriage ===
Her second husband was George Spencer-Churchill, 8th Duke of Marlborough (1844–1892), son of John Spencer-Churchill, 7th Duke of Marlborough, and Frances Spencer-Churchill, Duchess of Marlborough; they were married in New York City in New York City Hall by Mayor Abram Hewitt in May 1888. As a result of this marriage, she became the Duchess of Marlborough on 29 June 1888. The inheritance she received from her first husband was used to restore Blenheim Palace in Woodstock, Oxfordshire.

After the 1892 death of the 8th Duke and her subsequent remarriage, she sued her stepson, Charles Spencer-Churchill, 9th Duke of Marlborough, then married to Consuelo Vanderbilt, to retrieve the money spent on its restoration.

=== Third marriage ===
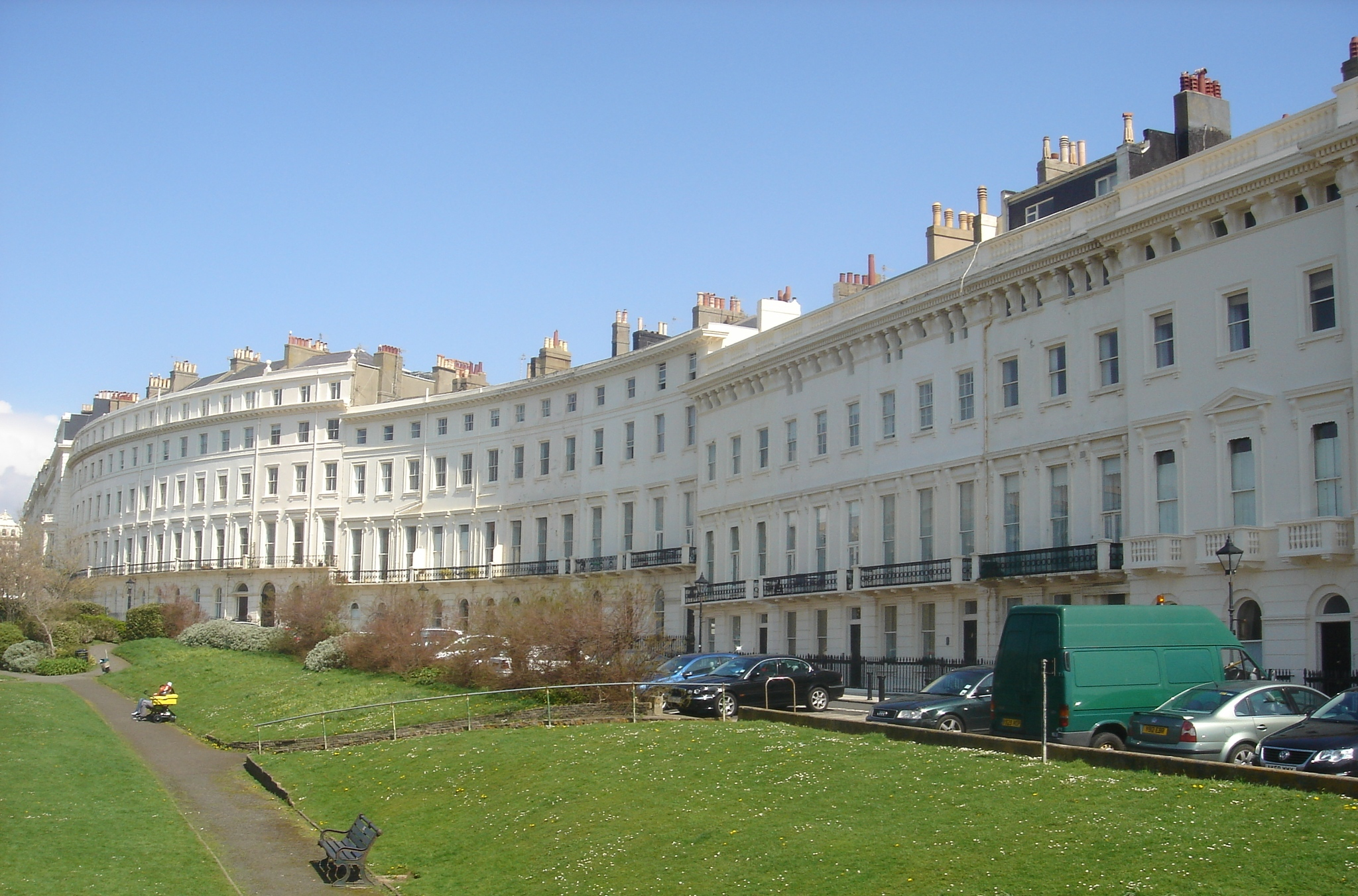
Adelaide Crescent in Hove, where she spent her last years.

Her third husband was Lord William de la Poer Beresford (1847–1900), son of John Beresford, 4th Marquess of Waterford (1814-1866) and Christiana Leslie. As a result of this marriage, which took place on April 30, 1895, she became known as Lady William Beresford. Before his death on 30 December 1900, they were the parents of one child:

- William Warren de la Poer Beresford (1897–1919).

Later, she resided at 35 Adelaide Crescent in Hove, East Sussex, where she was convalescent. She died on January 11, 1909, in Dorking, Surrey, England. She was buried in Beresford Family Crypt at Clonagam Churchyard in Portlaw (Ireland).
