= Louis Gordon Hamersley =

American sportsman and businessman (1892 - 1942)

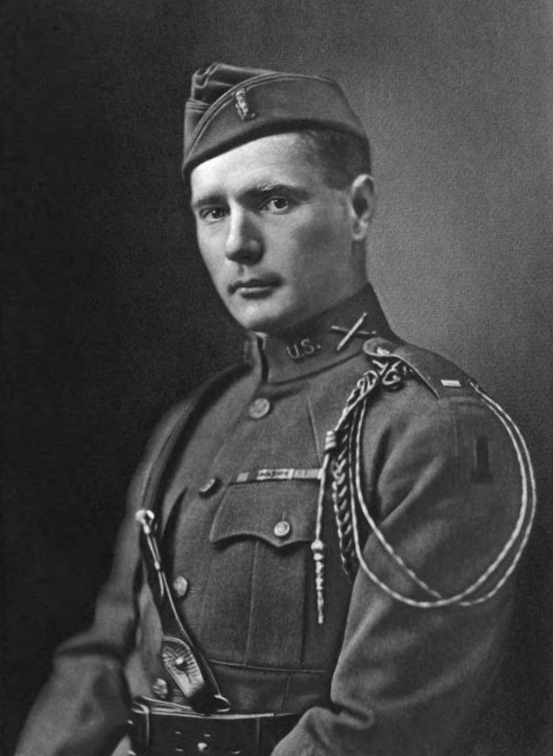
- Born: July 20, 1892; Newport, Rhode Island
- Died: June 2, 1942 (aged 49); Southampton, New York
- Education: St. Mark's School; Harvard University
- Occupation(s): Sportsman, investor
- Spouse: Hilles Morris
- Children: 4

Signature
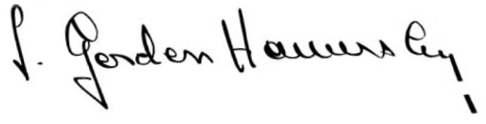

Louis Gordon Hamersley (July 20, 1892 – June 2, 1942) was an American sportsman, piloting and racing boats, and real estate investor.

== Early life ==
Hamersley was born on July 20, 1892, in Newport, Rhode Island. He was the youngest child and only son of James Hooker Hamersley (1844–1901) and Margaret Willing (née Chisolm) Hamersley (1863–1904). His only surviving sibling, Catherine Livingston Hamersley, married Samuel Neilson Hinckley, and, after their 1921 divorce, Henry Coleman Drayton, a grandson of Caroline and William Backhouse Astor Jr.

His paternal grandparents were Col. John William Hamersley and the former Catherine Livingston Hooker. Among his extended family were aunts Helen (wife of New York State Assemblyman Charles D. Stickney); Virginia (wife of Cortlandt de Peyster Field, son of Benjamin Hazard Field), and Catherine (wife of John H. Livingston). Through his father, he was a direct descendant of Sir Hugh Hamersley, a 17th-century merchant who was Lord Mayor of London, and Robert Livingston the Elder, the Scottish immigrant who was granted the Livingston Manor by royal charter. His maternal grandparents were William Edings Chisolm and the former Mary Ann Rogers, a niece of William Augustus Muhlenberg.

Hamersley attended St. Mark's School in Southborough, Massachusetts, and graduated from Harvard University in 1916 where he was one of the editors of the Lampoon.

== Career ==
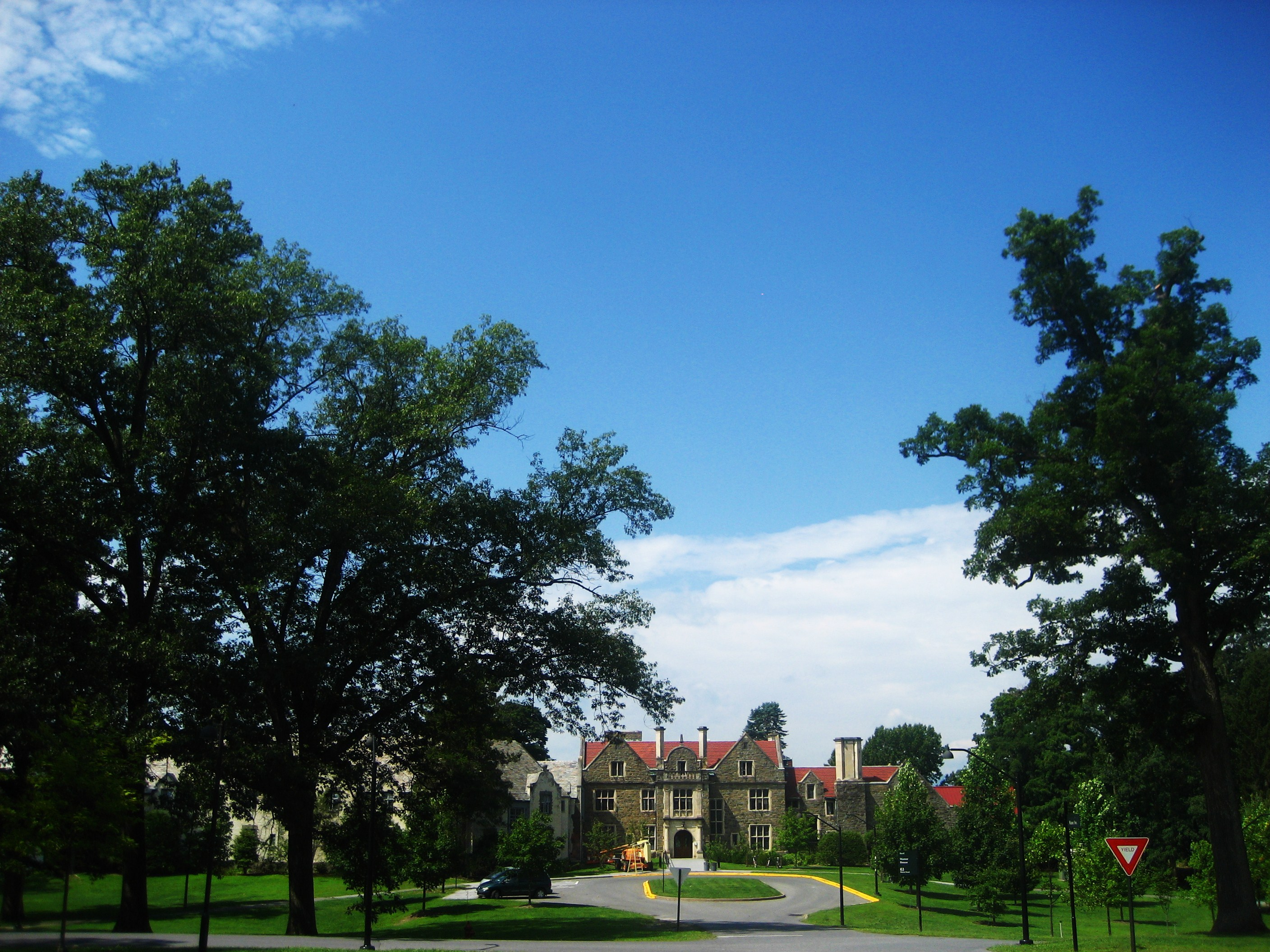
Hamersley's Dutchess County estate

In 1913, while at Harvard, the New York Court of Appeals ruled that he was the legal heir of the $7,000,000 estate of Louis Carré Hamersley, his father's cousin who died in 1883. The will stipulated the bulk of his estate went to his male issue, or if there was none, to his cousin (Louis' father) and his male descendants, but was appealed by several parties, including his cousin's late wife, Lily, who by then had married both George Spencer-Churchill, 8th Duke of Marlborough and Lord William Beresford before dying herself in 1909. Prior to his maturity, the Chemical National Bank managed the Hamersley estate. From 1937 to 1940, he served as president of the First Avenue Association and managed his large real estate empire out of 70 Pine Street in Manhattan.

In 1914, Hamersley purchased the former John Armstrong Jr. estate in Dutchess County and erected a tudor revival mansion and gatehouse designed by Francis Hoppin. He expanded his estate, acquiring several farms to the north, and Maizeland on Cruger's Island in 1920, eventually owning what was described at one time as the second largest in Dutchess County. In 1926, he sold the combined estate to William B. Ward who immediately donated it to the Association for Improving the Condition of the Poor in memory of his father Robert (founder of the Ward Baking Company).

He also owned an estate at Sands Point on Long Island. In 1923, he had the family mansion at 1030 Fifth Avenue demolished, and commissioned architects James Carpenter and Rosario Candela to build a modern apartment building on the site with a 23-room penthouse for Hamersley, which was completed in 1924.

=== Military career ===
After Harvard, Hamersley went to the Mexican border with Battery A of the Massachusetts National Guard, followed by a post as an ambulance driver for the American Field Service in France. While there, he attended the French Artillery School at Fontainebleau and, although the position of teaching horsemanship was offered to him, he joined the Sixth Field Artillery of the A.E.F's First Division as a lieutenant. He served in many engagements, and after the Armistice of 1918 was with the United States Army of Occupation in Germany for nine months. Hamersley later became a major in the Field Artillery Reserve and was a commander of the Jeff Heigl Post of the American Legion.

=== Sportsman ===
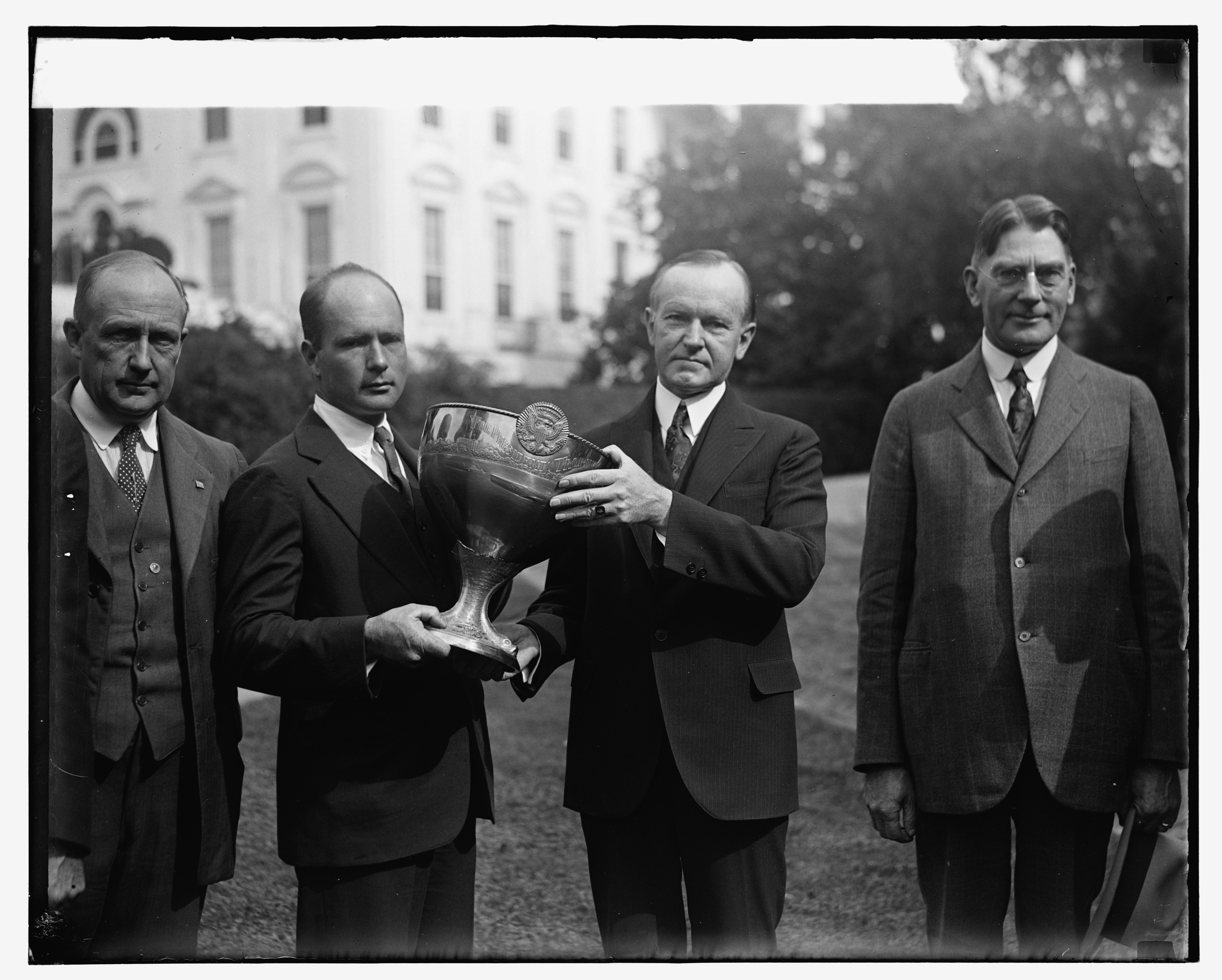
Coolidge presents President's Cup to Hammersly in 1926.

Hamersley was well-known as a speed-boat pilot and, in 1925, he made a record run of 2 hours and 38 minutes from New York to Albany in his speedboat Cigarette Jr. In 1926, Cigarette IV won the first national speedboat regatta on the Potomac River and Hamersley received the President's Cup from President Calvin Coolidge. He also raced his schooner, Countess.

== Personal life ==
In 1926, Hamersley was married to Hilles Morris (1907–2000), the daughter of Elizabeth (née Wynkoop) Morris stock broker Stuyvesant Fish Morris Jr. and granddaughter Stuyvesant Fish Morris and Elly (née Van Buren) Morris (granddaughter of President Martin Van Buren). Together, they had residences in Southampton on Long Island, in Palm Beach in Florida, and at 1030 Fifth Avenue in Manhattan, and were the parents of one daughter and three sons:

- Louis Gordon Hamersley Jr. (1928–2008)
- Stuyvesant Morris Hamersley (1932–2014)
- Hilles Elizabeth Hamersley (1935–2014)
- James Hooker Hamersley II (1937–1999), a writer, photographer and pilot.

After a brief illness, he died on June 2, 1942, at Southampton and was buried at Trinity Church Cemetery in Manhattan. After his death, his widow remarried, and was widowed from George Leslie Bartlett and Robert C. L. Timpson, managing partner of W. E. Hutton & Co.
