= Goodhue Livingston =

American architect (1867–1951)

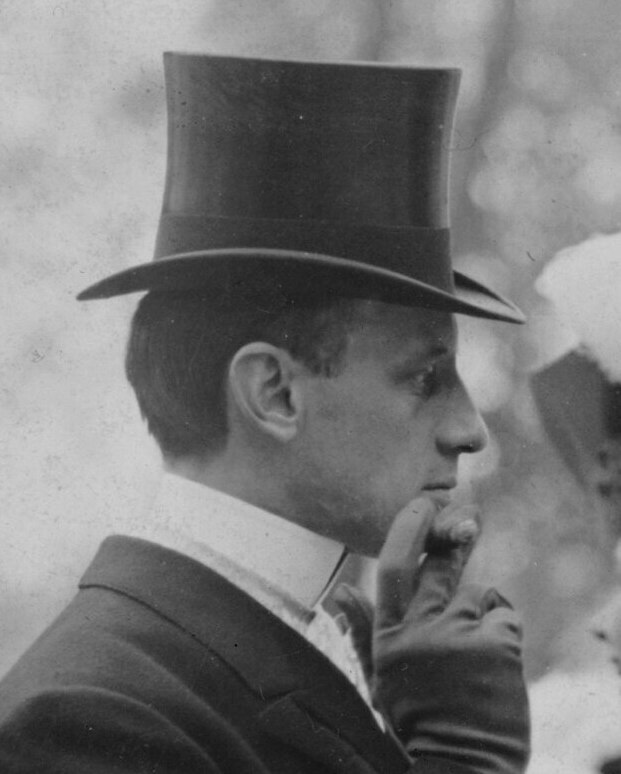
- Livingston in 1906
- Born: February 23, 1867; New York City, U.S.
- Died: June 3, 1951 (aged 84); Southampton, New York, U.S.
- Education: Columbia University
- Occupation: Architect
- Spouse: Louisa Robb
- Partner(s): Stockton B. Colt; Breck Trowbridge
- Children: 2
- Awards: Medal of Honor, Architectural League of New York
- Practice: Trowbridge & Livingston; Trowbridge, Colt & Livingston
- Buildings: Hayden Planetarium; Palace Hotel; St. Regis New York; Oregon State Capital

Goodhue Livingston (February 23, 1867 – June 3, 1951) was an American architect who co-founded the firm of Trowbridge & Livingston. He designed the St. Regis New York, the Hayden Planetarium, and numerous buildings listed on the National Register of Historic Places.

== Early life ==
Livingston was born in New York City. He was the son of Susan Maria Clarkson de Peyster (1823 – 1910) and Robert Edward Livingston (1820 – 1889), who inherited wealth and did not work. His paternal grandfather was Edward Philip Livingston, the 11th Lieutenant Governor of New York. His paternal great-grandfather, Philip R. Livingston, was a signatory of the Declaration of Independence and member of the first Continental Congress.

Livingston attended Columbia University, receiving an A.B. in 1888, a Ph.B. in architecture 1892, and an MA in 1914. While there, he joined the Fraternity of Delta Psi (St. Anthony Hall). He also participated in Columbia's Dramatic Club.

== Career ==
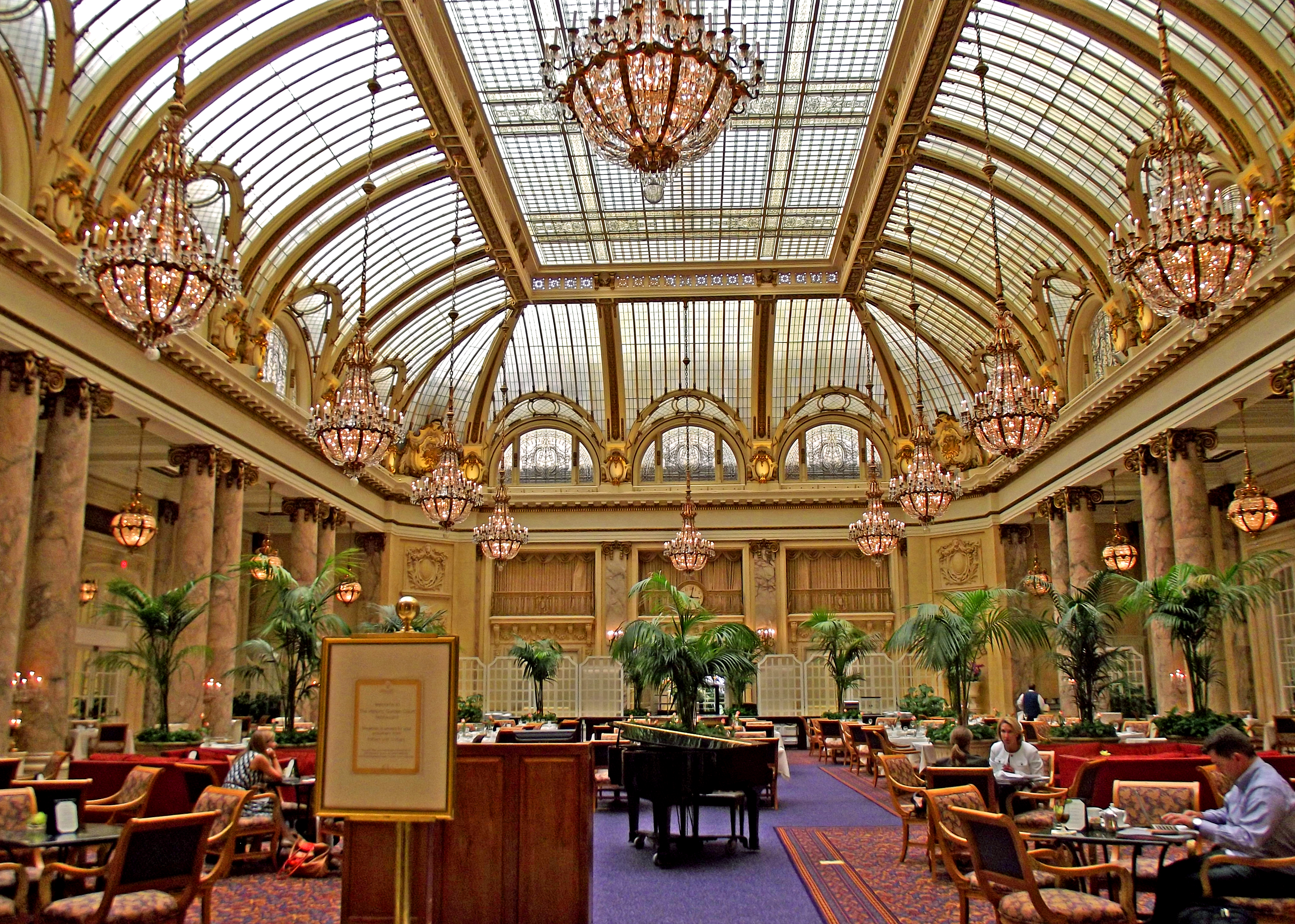
Garden of the Palace Hotel

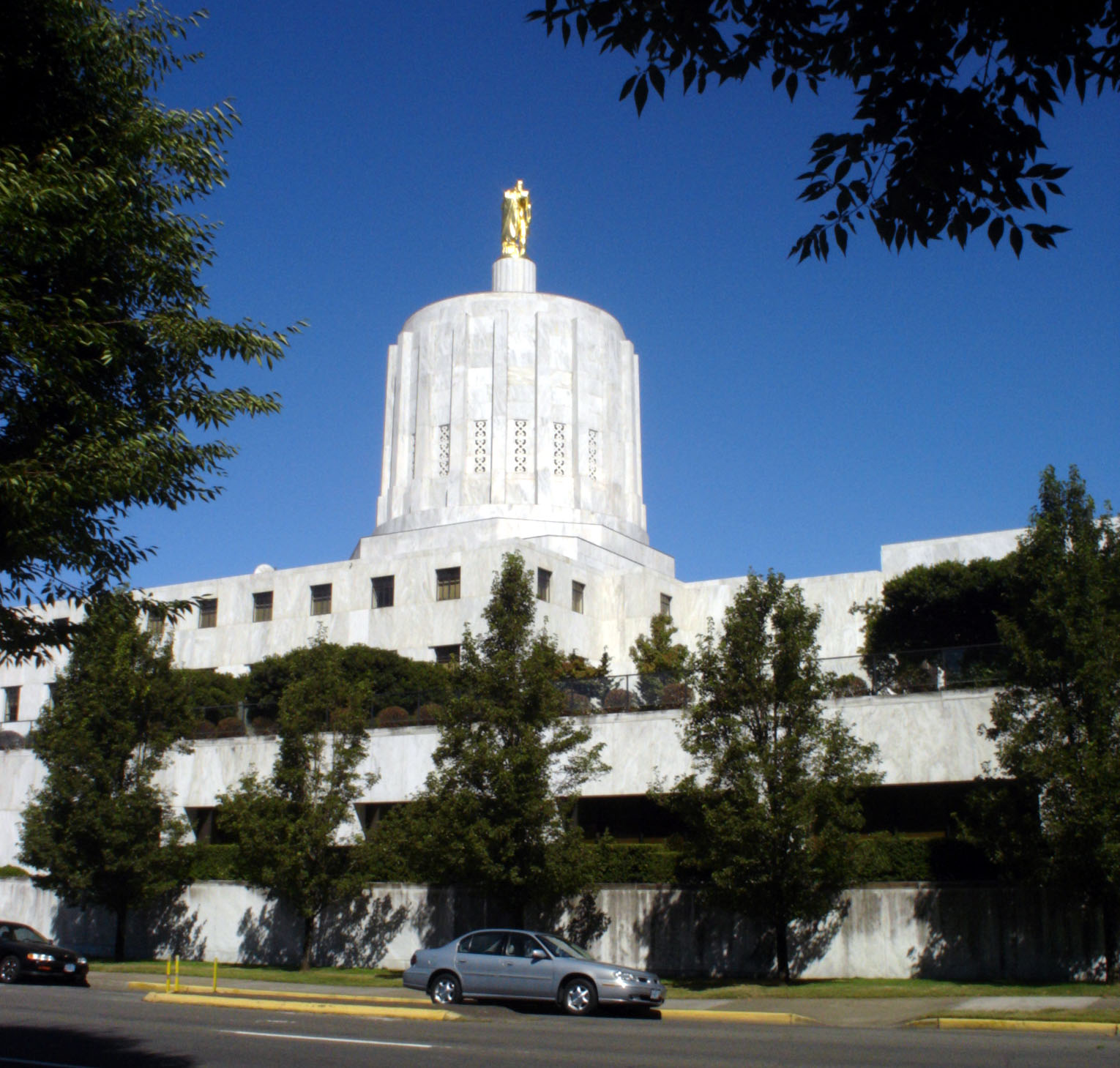
Oregon State Capitol

In 1894, Livingston co-founded Trowbridge, Livingston & Colt in New York City along with Stockton B. Colt and Samuel Breck Parkman Trowbridge. Colt and Livingston were fraternity brothers, and all three attended Columbia University together. When Colt left the firm in 1897, its name changed to Trowbridge & Livingston.

Trowbridge & Livingston became known for its commercial, institutional, and public buildings, many in Beaux Arts or Neoclassical architectural styles. Often commissioned by well-heeled clients, the firm's work was especially prevalent on the Upper East Side and Wall Street precincts of New York City.

One of Livingston's early commissions was the Ardsley Club (1896), designed for its founding members including J. P. Morgan, John D. Rockefeller, William Rockefeller Jr., and Cornelius Vanderbilt II.

In New York City, Livingston designed the Renaissance Revival style B. Altman and Company Building (1905), the Neo-Classical style Bankers Trust Company Building (1912), the Chemical National Bank Building (1907), Rikers Island Penitentiary, and the Baroque style St. Regis New York hotel (1904). The firm acquired the contract for the St. Regis from John Jacob Astor IV through a design contest. The hotel was "hailed in the press not just for its architectural and technological brilliance, but for what one columnist characterized as its role in shaping the face and style of New York.”

He also designed the interior of The Knickerbocker Hotel in 1906 and an addition for the New York Stock Exchange in 1923. In 1935, Livingston designed the Hayden Planetarium for the American Museum of Natural History in New York City.

In Pittsburgh, Pennsylvania, he designed the United States Post Office & Courthouse (aka the Joseph F. Weis, Jr. U.S. Courthouse) in 1931 and the Gulf Building or Gulf Tower in 1932; the latter with the architect Edward Mellon He was the architect for the Mitsui Bank and Trust Company of Tokyo and the Palace Hotel in San Francisco (1909). He also designed the Oregon State Capital (1938) in Salem with architect Francis Keally.

He retired in 1946.

== Professional affiliations ==
Livingston was a member of the Architectural League of New York, and the National Institute of Social Sciences. He was a fellow of the American Institute of Architects.

Livingston received the Medal of Honor from the Architectural League of New York.

== Personal ==
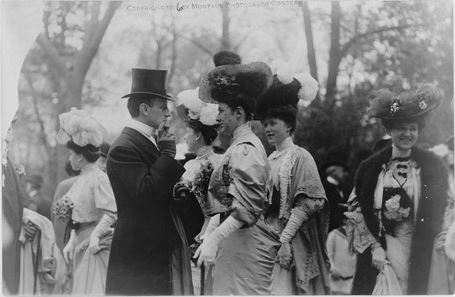
Livingston, Mrs. Alfred Gwynne Vanderbilt, and Louisa Livingston at Coaching Club event, New York City, May 11, 1906

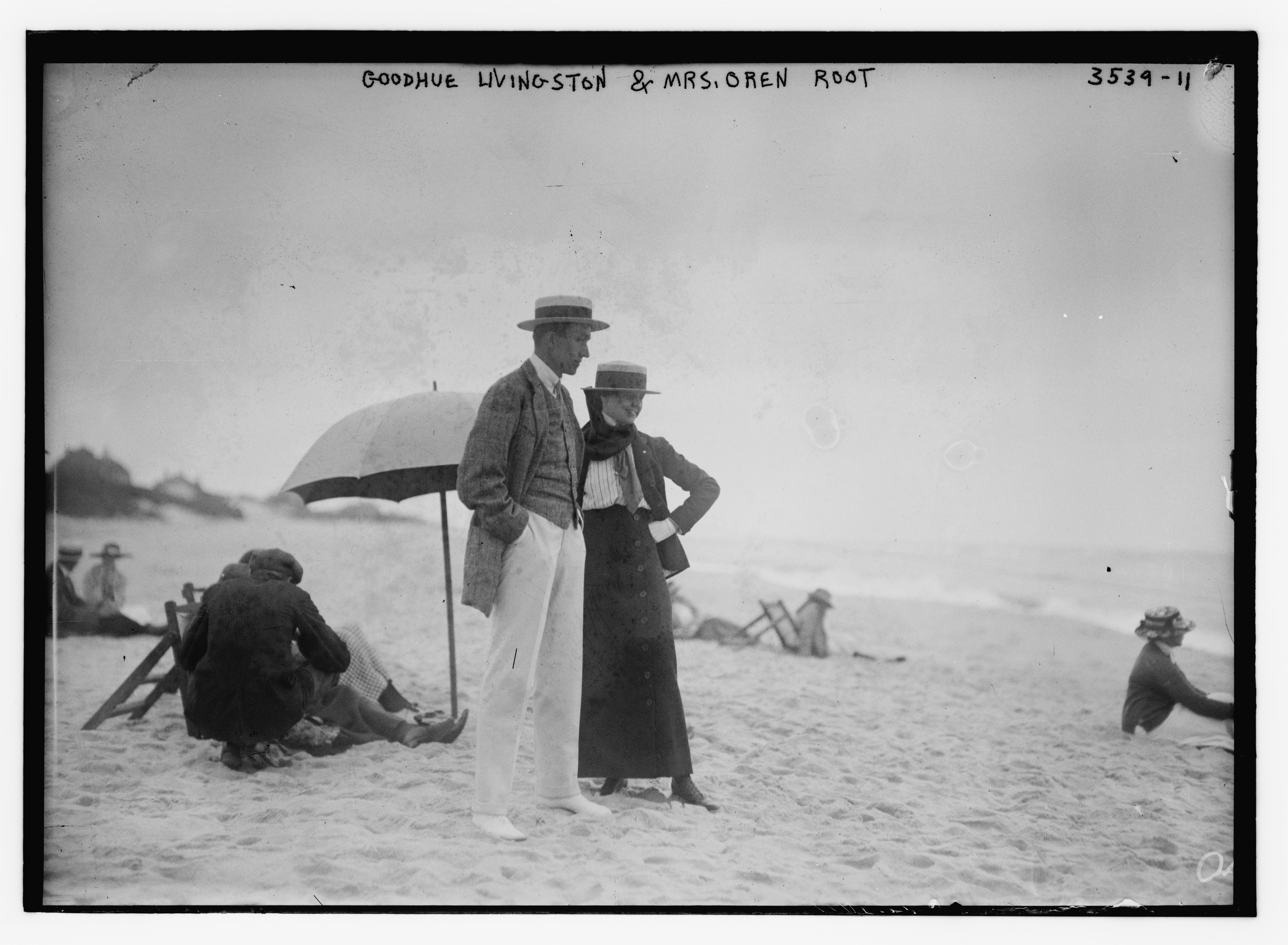
Livingston and Mrs. Oren Root, circa 1910

Livingston married Louisa Robb (1877 – 1960) on April 8, 1896, at St. George’s Episcopal Church in New York City. She was the daughter of Cornelia Van Rensselaer (née Thayer) and James Hampden Robb, a banker, cotton merchant, New York City Parks Commissioner, and New York State Senator.

Together, they were the parents of Goodhue Livingston Jr. (born 1897) and Cornelia Thayer Livingston (born 1903). In 1912, Livingston was charged with mismanagement of his children's trust funds of $120,000 each. It was claimed that Livingston had invested some of the funds in stock rather than securities as required by law.

The family lived at 38 East 65th Street in New York City. They also had a summer home in Southampton, Long Island, New York that was designed by Livingston. The Southampton property was located on ten acres beside The Dolphins, Louisa's childhood summer home. Livingston designed their Georgian Revival mansion "Old Trees" with gardens, stables, and service buildings. The name was derived from the landscaped ground's many trees. At Old Trees, the family had a butler, gardeners, maids, and other servants to allow them to entertain high society and maintain the large estate. Louisa noted, "Southampton has footmen, but we’ve never had footmen in knee britches.” However, the era of the footmen ended with World War II, when just their butler remained.

In 1922, burglars stole $20,000 in jewelry from Oak Trees while the Livingstons were entertaining there; most of the stolen jewelry was an heirloom.

Livingston was a trustee of the New York Dispensary. He was a founder of the National Golf Links of America and was also a president and member of the Meadow Club, a president and member of the Southampton Golf Club, and member of the Shinnecock Hills Golf Club.

He served on the board of governors of The Brook Club and was a member of the Century Association, the Knickerbocker Club, the Masons, the Racquet and Tennis Club, and the St. Anthony Club of New York.

In 1951, Livingston died of a heart ailment at the Southampton Hospital in Southampton, New York. At the time, his residence was 720 Park Avenue in New York City.
