= Harkness Mansion =

The Harkness Mansion may refer to:

- The Nathaniel L. McCready House, a mansion at 4 East 75th Street in New York City completed in 1896
- The Edward S. Harkness House, a mansion at 1 East 75th Street in New York City completed in 1908
