= Wickes Washburn =

American Psychiatrist (1853–1922)

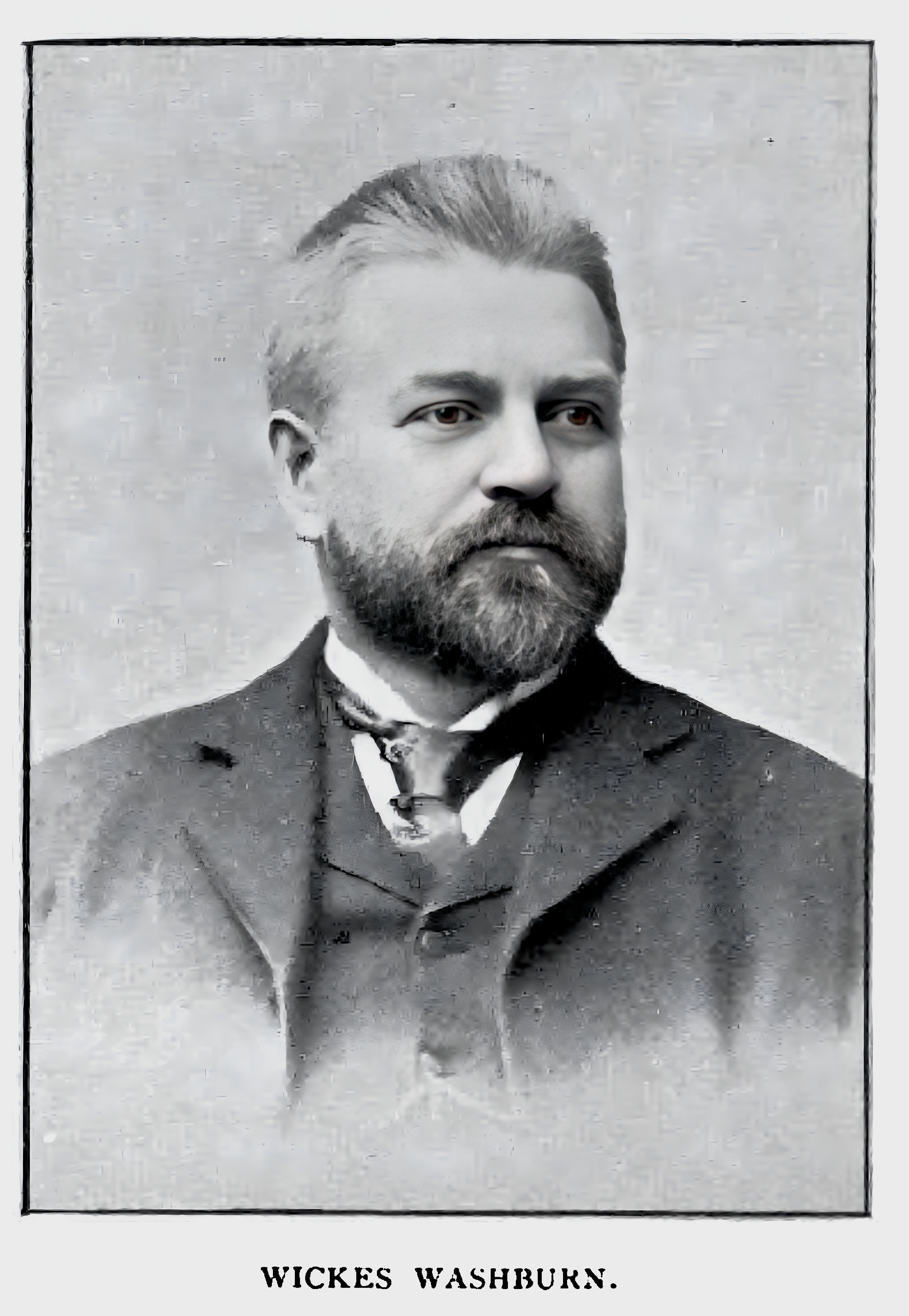
- New York City alienist, 1853–1922

Personal details
- Born: Wickes Washburn; September 19, 1853 La Grange, New York, U.S.
- Died: June 19, 1922 (aged 68) Elizabeth, New Jersey, U.S.
- Education: Oswego Normal and Training School; Medical Department of the University of the City of New York

Wickes Washburn (September 19, 1853 – June 19, 1922) was an American physician, psychiatrist, and surgeon, known for his work with the mentally ill in New York City. He served as Assistant Superintendent of Ward's Island Insane Asylum and contributed significantly to medical education, public health reform, and early psychiatric practices in the late 19th century.

== Early life and education ==
Washburn was born in LaGrange, New York, to Morgan S. Washburn and Nancy C. Wickes, and was a descendant of early American settlers. He attended Oswego Normal and Training School and began studying medicine in 1874 under Dr. Clark A. Nicholson. He later trained with Dr. Alfred L. Loomis in New York City and attended the University of the City of New York's Medical Department (now NYU School of Medicine), where he earned his M.D. in 1877.

== Career ==
Following graduation, Washburn joined Ward's Island Insane Asylum as assistant physician after a competitive examination, working there from 1876 to 1878. Promoted to Assistant Superintendent in 1878, he held the role until June 1880, overseeing patient care and treatment in the asylum's men's department. His work there reflected the evolving standards and challenges in psychiatric care at the time.

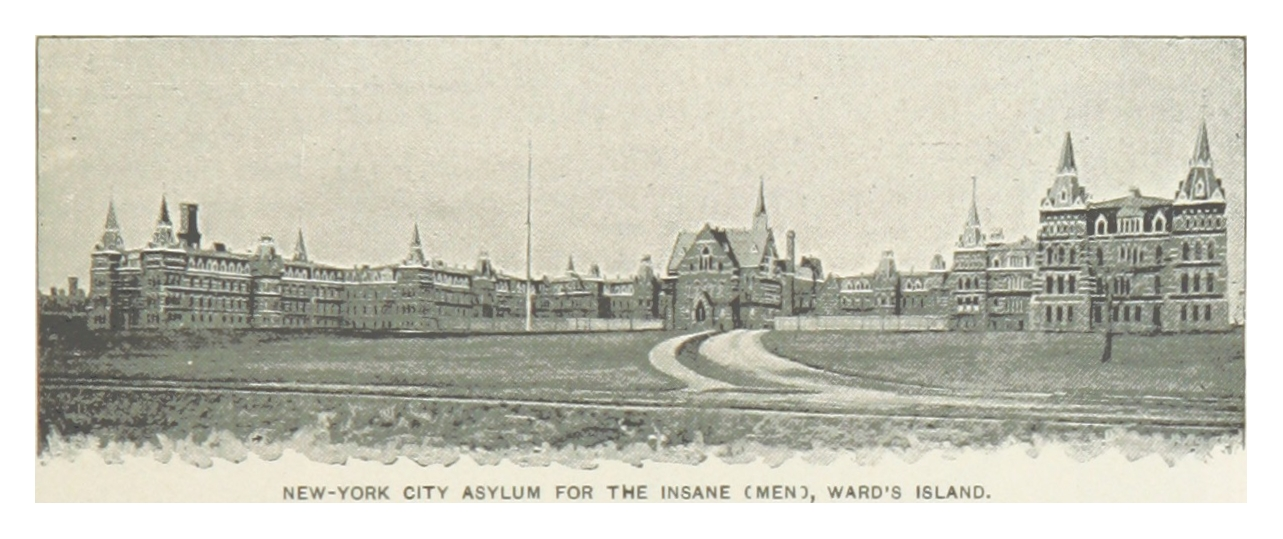
NEW-YORK CITY ASYLUM FOR THE INSANE (MEN), WARD'S ISLAND, 1893

In 1881, Washburn was involved in documenting an unusual endurance event, observing Welsh "pedestrian" William Gale as he attempted to set a walking record by completing 6,000 quarter-miles in ten-minute intervals. Washburn's twice-daily medical observations provided insights into the effects of prolonged physical exertion, illustrating his interest in physical and mental endurance.

In 1883, Washburn responded to the tragic fire at Most Holy Redeemer Church School. He attempted resuscitations but noted the lack of galvanic equipment for effective resuscitation. His interest in using galvanic methods reflects early medical innovations in life-saving technology.

Throughout the 1880s, Washburn expanded his medical practice. He was a district physician at the Marian Street Lying-in Asylum (1883–1888) and held appointments as a medical examiner for both the American Legion of Honor and the Brooklyn Life Insurance Company. He also served as assistant surgeon for the U.S. Army, attending physician at New York Hospital, and physician at Grace Chapel.

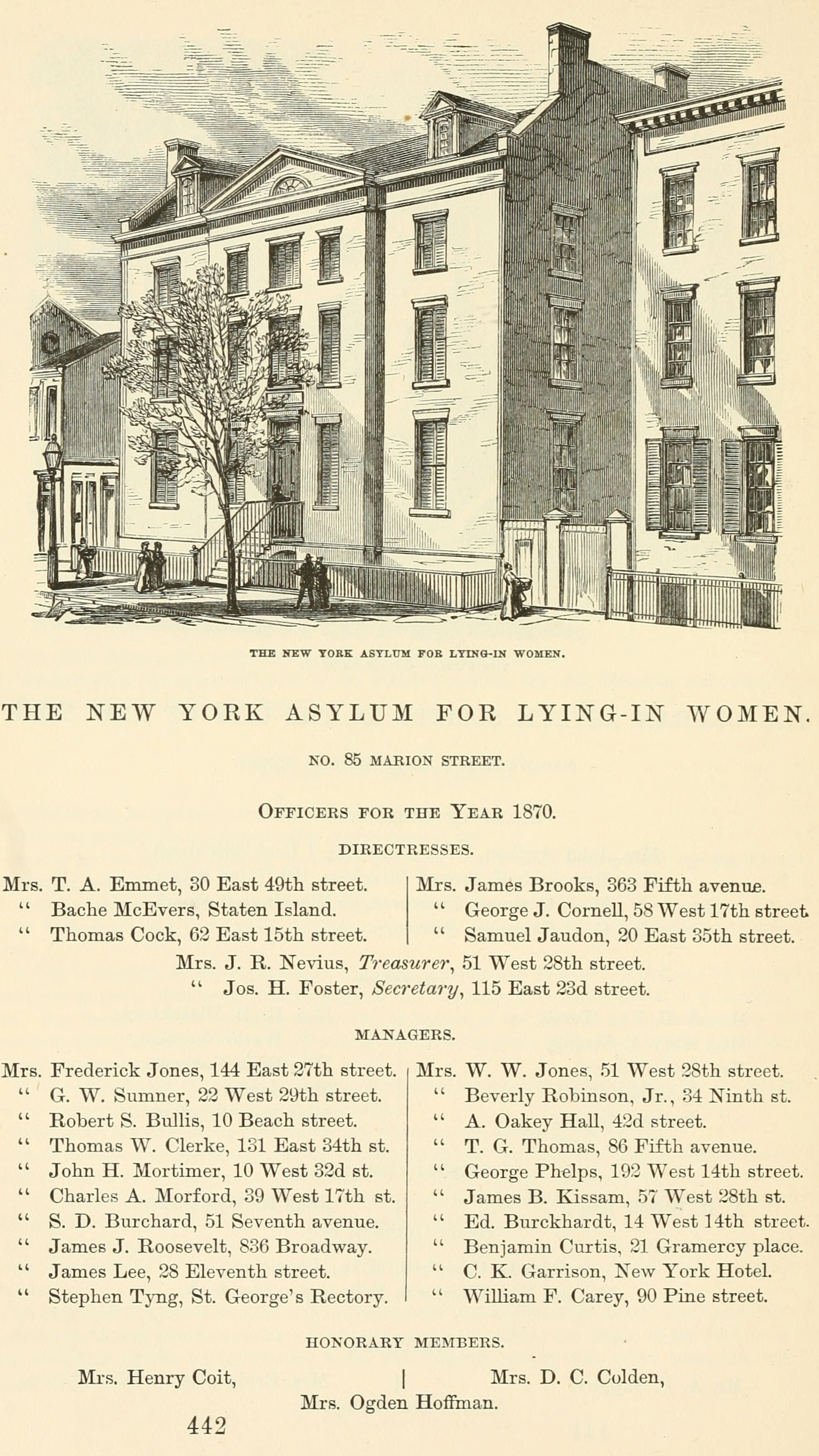
New York Asylum for Lying-in Women, 1870

Washburn made significant contributions to medical education by teaching medical jurisprudence and insanity at the University Medical Department from 1879 to 1887. His lectures emphasized the medico-legal responsibilities of treating psychiatric patients, marking early developments in forensic psychiatry.

Washburn's public health advocacy is also reflected in his involvement in exposing "baby farms"—a practice where infants were boarded under exploitative conditions. In one 1883 case, he reported a woman named Mrs. Glitsch for neglecting infants in exchange for money, which contributed to early reforms in childcare practices.

In 1889, Washburn evaluated Baron Emil F. O. Sucrow, a German entrepreneur who had turned to unconventional schemes in an attempt to escape poverty. After observing Sucrow's behavior, Washburn diagnosed him as insane, leading to his admission to Ward's Island asylum.

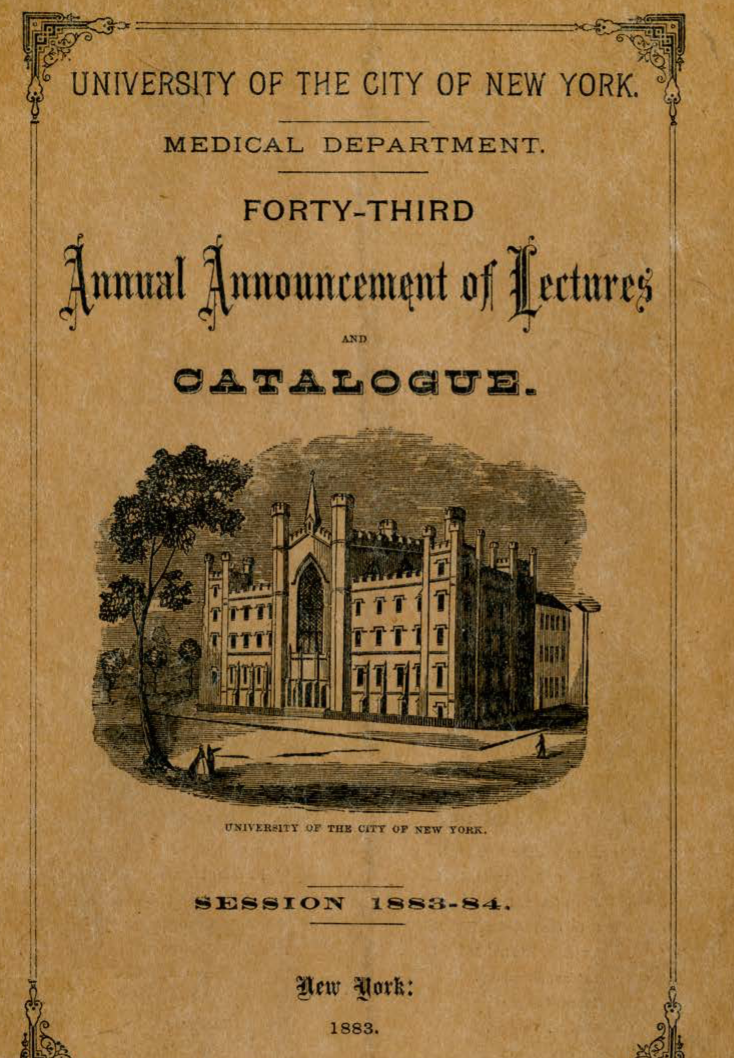
1883 University of the City of New York Medical Department. Annual Announcement of Lectures and Catalogue Session

== Professional affiliations and publications ==
Washburn maintained active membership in the Medical Society of the County of New York and the Charity Organization Society of New York City. He contributed articles on psychiatry and public health to The Medical Record and other medical periodicals, sharing his expertise in psychiatric and public health issues.

== Personal life ==
In 1880 Washburn married Mary Pixley of Great Barrington, Massachusetts. They later divorced, and he married Cora Maud Freeland in 1911. Washburn faced professional and personal challenges, including accusations of patient mistreatment and involvement in legal cases. He died on June 19, 1922, in Elizabeth, New Jersey.

== Legacy ==
Washburn's work in psychiatry and medical jurisprudence positioned him as a prominent figure in New York City's mental health history. His advocacy for patient rights, early childcare reforms, and contributions to medical education reflected the evolving standards in mental health care and public health reform during his career.

== See also ==
- Ward's Island Asylum
- History of psychiatry
- Medical jurisprudence
