= Stockton B. Colt =

American architect (1863–1937)

- Born: Stockton Beekman Colt; March 20, 1863; Paterson, New Jersey, U.S.
- Died: June 22, 1937 (aged 74); Elizabeth, New Jersey, U.S.
- Education: Columbia University
- Occupation: Architect
- Practice: Stockton B. Colt; Colt & Chard; Barney & Colt; Trowbridge, Colt & Livingston; George B. Post
- Buildings: Barclay Building; Emmet Building; Nathaniel L. McCready House

Stockton Beekman Colt (March 20, 1863 – June 22, 1937) was an American architect noted for using the Renaissance style. A graduate of Columbia University, where he was a member of the Philolexian Society, Colt apprenticed with George B. Post in New York City. In 1894, he was a founding partner in Trowbridge, Colt & Livingston with Goodhue Livingston and Samuel Beck Parkman Trowbridge.

Colt struck out on his own after three years and later formed partnerships with John Stewart Barney and Thornton Chard His New York City practice specialized in large private homes for the wealthy in Manhattan, New Jersey, and elsewhere in New York. Built from 1895 to 1896, the Nathaniel L. McCready House, the 1899 Anna Jackson and William Walton Rutherfurd House, and the 1913 Arthur Curtiss James Carriage House are surviving examples of his residential work and are part of the Upper East Side Historic District in New York City.

Colt also designed commercial buildings in New York City. Two of his early 20th-century skyscrapers survive–the Barclay Building (also known as the Ungar Building) and the Emmet Building. The latter is considered the first New York City skyscraper with a residence and is also notable for its experimental ornamentation, where Colt tested the limits of terracotta. The Emmett Building is a New York City Landmark and is also located in the Madison Square North Historic District.

Colt was both architect and engineer for the Barclay Building. For this project, he experimented with new materials and design techniques to create a fireproof building. At the time, the profession viewed it as the greatest advancement in building fireproofing. These safety innovations were continued in Colt's design for the Second Precinct Police Station on Greenwich Street in New York City in 1907; although this building was probably better known for completely reenvisioning the design and layout of a precinct station.

== Early life ==
Colt was born in Paterson, New Jersey, and grew up in his family's home, The Harbourage, which was located in Rumson Neck in Monmouth County, New Jersey. He was the son of Jane (née Barrow) and Elisha Boudinot Colt. The Colt family were early residents of Paterson known for manufacturing firearms. However, Colt's side of the family made their money as the nation's largest manufacturer of cotton duck for sails and through involvement in the Society for the Establishment of Useful Manufacturers (S.U.M.) which controlled the power generated by the Great Falls of the Passaic River. A graduate of Princeton University, Boudinot Colt ran Passaic Manufacturing Company and its Duck Mill until the industry declined when clipper ships were replaced; he became the director of the Equitable Life Assurance Society in New York City around 1885 and moved the family to Newark in 1890, but continued as president of S.U.M. until 1895.

Colt attended Columbia University, graduating with an architecture degree in 1888. At Columbia, he was a member of the Fraternity of Delta Psi (St. Anthony Hall).

== Career ==
After graduating from Columbia, Colt apprenticed in the office of George B. Post in New York City. In 1894, he was a founding partner in Trowbridge, Colt & Livingston in New York City with Goodhue Livingston and Samuel Beck Parkman Trowbridge. Livingstone, like Colt, studied architecture at Columbia University. However, Colt quit the partnership three years later in 1897, opening his independent practice at 287 4th Avenue in New York City.

In 1912, he formed Barney & Colt with John Stewart Barney, with offices at 40 West 38th Street in New York City. Barney had also attended Columbia University and worked for George B. Post. The duo's first collaboration was most likely the Emmet Building. This partnership lasted until around 1922.

Overlapping his work with Barney, Colt also collaborated with architect Thornton Chard in the early 20th century—as Stockton Beekman Colt and Thornton Chard, Associated Architects. One of their projects was a neo-Georgian house at 68 East 56th Street in New York City.

Colt retired from architecture in 1928.

== Projects ==
Colt preferred to work in the Renaissance style. He specialized in large private homes in New Jersey, Manhattan, and elsewhere in New York. However, he also designed commercial buildings in New York City

=== Nathaniel L. McCready House ===
The Nathaniel L. McCready House was built from 1895 to 1896 at 4 East 75th Street in New York City. It was designed by Trowbridge, Colt & Livingston in the neo-French Renaissance style with Francois I style detailing. The 25-room mansion is four-stories tall and 50 feet (15 m) wide, unusually wide for New York City. Its exterior is limestone with a wrought-iron balcony that runs the length of the second story. There are swags and garlands at the crest of the slate roof, along with three pediments. The New-York Tribune wrote, “Mr. and Mrs. McCready...are the possessors of one of the most beautiful homes in New York, and so thoroughly French that it looks as if it might have been brought over from Paris and set down in Seventy-fifth St.” Today, this house is part of the Upper East Side Historic District.

=== Rutherfurd House ===
In 1899, Colt designed a neo-Georgian façade for the preexisting home of newlyweds Anna Jackson and William Walton Rutherfurd. Dating from around 1871, the five-story house is located at 14 East 74th Street in New York City. Colt removed its original brownstone exterior, giving the house a mansard roof, second-story balcony with ornate ironwork, and stone work for the base and window lintels. This house is now part of the Upper East Side Historic District.

=== Barclay Building ===
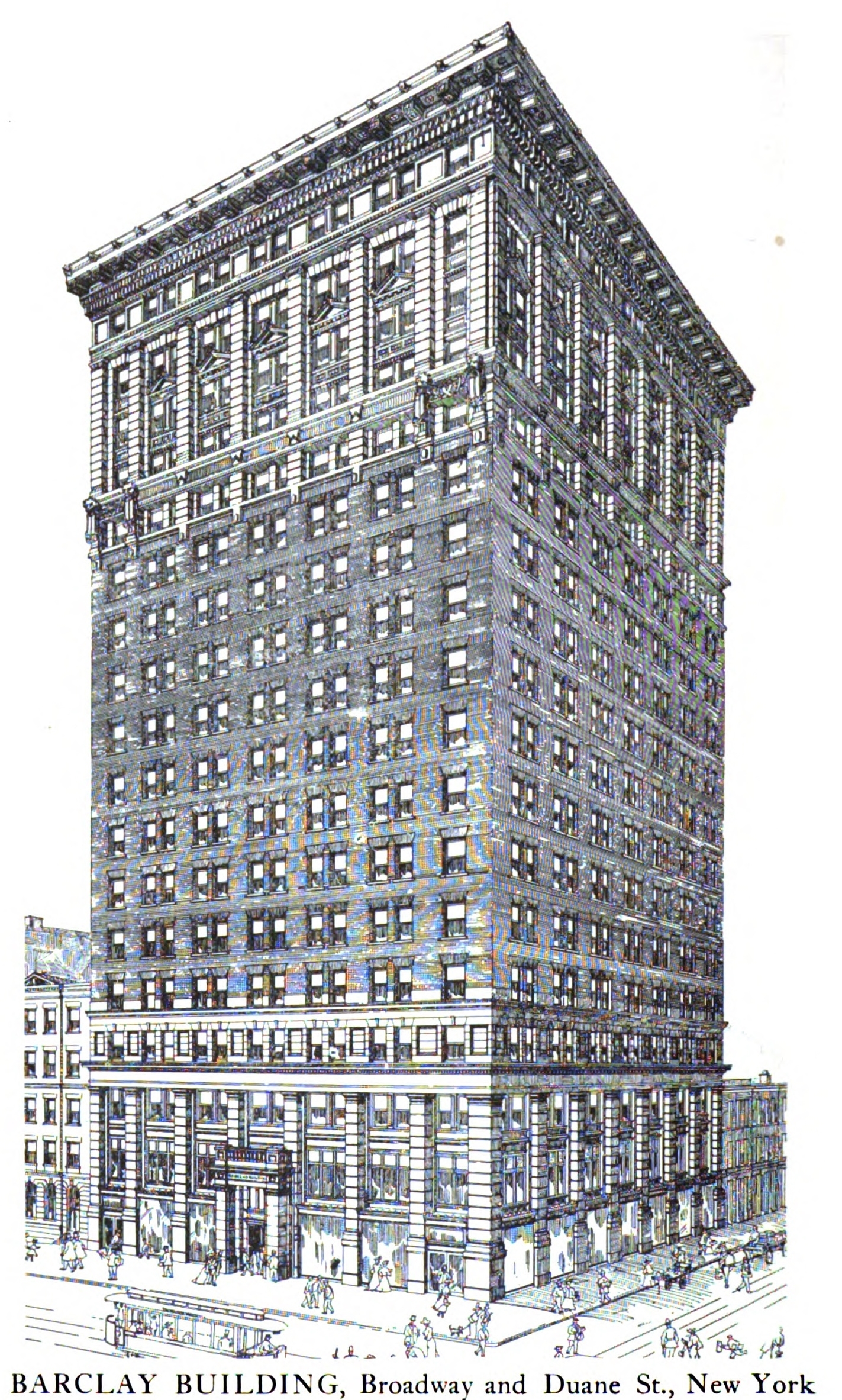
Barclay Building in 1905

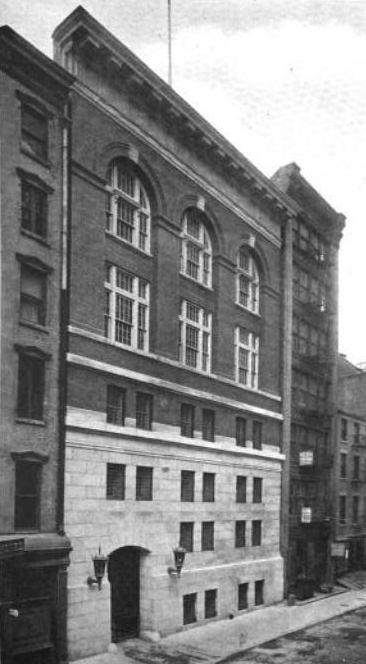
Second Precinct Police Station in 1910

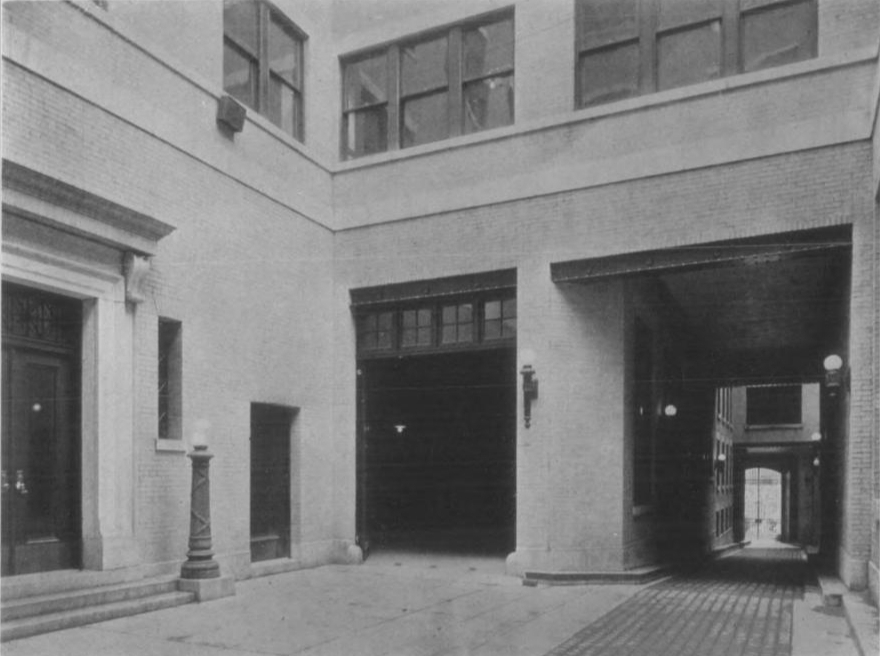
Courtyard of Second Precinct Police Station in 1910

The U-shaped Barclay Building was built in 1905 at 299 Broadway and Duane Street in New York City. It is twenty-stories, with two of those levels underground. The exterior of the building has three finishes: the first four stories are of Indiana limestone, the next nine stories are in red brick, and the top five stories are finished in terracotta. At the top there is an overhanging cornice, making the terracotta section resemble a frieze. Architects and Buildings Magazine wrote, "The exterior of the building is of plain dignified design and gives one the impression of a very substantial construction which further knowledge of the building verifies."

On the interior, the first two floors had walls paneled in marble with bronze metalwork. The upper floors had five-foot-tall marble wainscotting in the hallways. The stairways and eight elevators had ornamental ironwork by Hecla Iron Works. Colt included new technologies such as an electric clock system linked throughout the building and a vacuum air sweeping system with four hook-ups on each floor to transport the collected dust in the basement. There was also a chilled and filtered water fountain on each floor, constructed out of marble.

Colt was not only responsible for the design of the Barclay Building but also for its engineering. The building's electricity was created by dynamos in the basement, and heating was a mixture of forced air and steam heat. Colt used steel frame construction, but in an atypical technique called cantilever. In addition to the benefits of the steel framing, he ensured fire safety by using hollow–tiles, cement floors, and Mississippi Wire Glass for windows and skylights. He even covered the wood trim throughout the building with sheet metal, and included high-velocity standpipes throughout the building to feed water to linen firehoses. American Architecture and Building News wrote, “The design of the Barclay Building realizes, perhaps, the greatest advance made, to date, in the elimination of combustible materials."

The building was renovated in 1989 and 2017 is now known as the Unger Building.

=== New York City renovations ===
In 1906, Colt converted the first two stories of 113 Nassau Street into a restaurant for the Codington Luncheon Company. This was an $8,000 project (equivalent to $286,667 in today's money). In 1907, he enlarged and remodeled the four-story home of J. P. Whiton-Stuart at 8 East 54th Street. The $15,000 (equivalent to $518,304 in today's money) project included adding a brick Colonial Revival façade with marble trim, a deck house, and an elevator. In 1908, Colt designed a rear extension for Dr. Thomas Addis Emmet's house at 89 Madison Avenue. Emmet would return to Colt for a bigger project a few years later—a skyscraper called the Emmet Building.

=== Second Precinct Police Station ===
In 1907, Colt and Chard designed a police station for New York City. Located at 156–158 Greenwich Street, the four-story Second Precinct Police Station was in Italian Renaissance style and cost $182,979, nearly $6,556,747 in today's money. The building was described as "a dignified, substantial structure". On the exterior, the station's first story and mezzanine level were finished in Deer Island granite, with red brick covering the upper levels. The top-level included three large bay windows. The building was capped with Doric entablature carved from limestone. Its gates, lamps, and window guards were made from wrought iron fabricated by Harris H. Uris Iron Works. The heavy iron gates provided both security and privacy.

The interior layout departed from the typical New York City police station. The goal was to provide privacy for the muster room, the lieutenant's desk, and the area where prisoners exited the patrol wagon. Colt and Chard accomplished this by having a central court, accessed by a driveway from either Greenwich Street or Washington Street. The courtyard also led to the stables with their own ventilation system. The morgue was adjacent to the stables and also had separate ventilation. There was also a garage for the repair and storage of automobiles, as well as a gasoline pump house. Other main-level features include a separate entrance for reporters, reading and recreation rooms for police officers, and living quarters for a matron. There was also space to add an elevator.

The cell blocks were three tiers tall and separated for men and women. There were thirty cells for men and fifteen cells for women, all built to modern standards with sanitation and ventilation, along with doors and windows that had tool-proof steel bars. The upper levels consisted of sleeping quarters for the policemen, including twelve private rooms with toilets for the officers and nine dormitories that housed 160 men. The dorms included toilets, showers, lockers, and drier rooms for wet boots and clothing. The dormitories were basic, but built to hospital standards for spacing and with hospital finishes throughout. The roof had a gymnasium that could also serve as a kitchen and mess hall in case of a riot. The basement contained boilers, coal storage, a repair shop, and storage for evidence.

To fireproof the building, Colt and Chard added block partitions, terracotta floor arches, steel girders, and steel floor beams. The stairways were iron and slate, and there was marble wainscotting in the muster room. In addition, the public areas had terrazzo and cement floors and marble wainscotting in the vestibule.

In 1962, the Second Precinct Police Station was razed for the construction of the World Trade Center complex.

=== Emmet Building ===
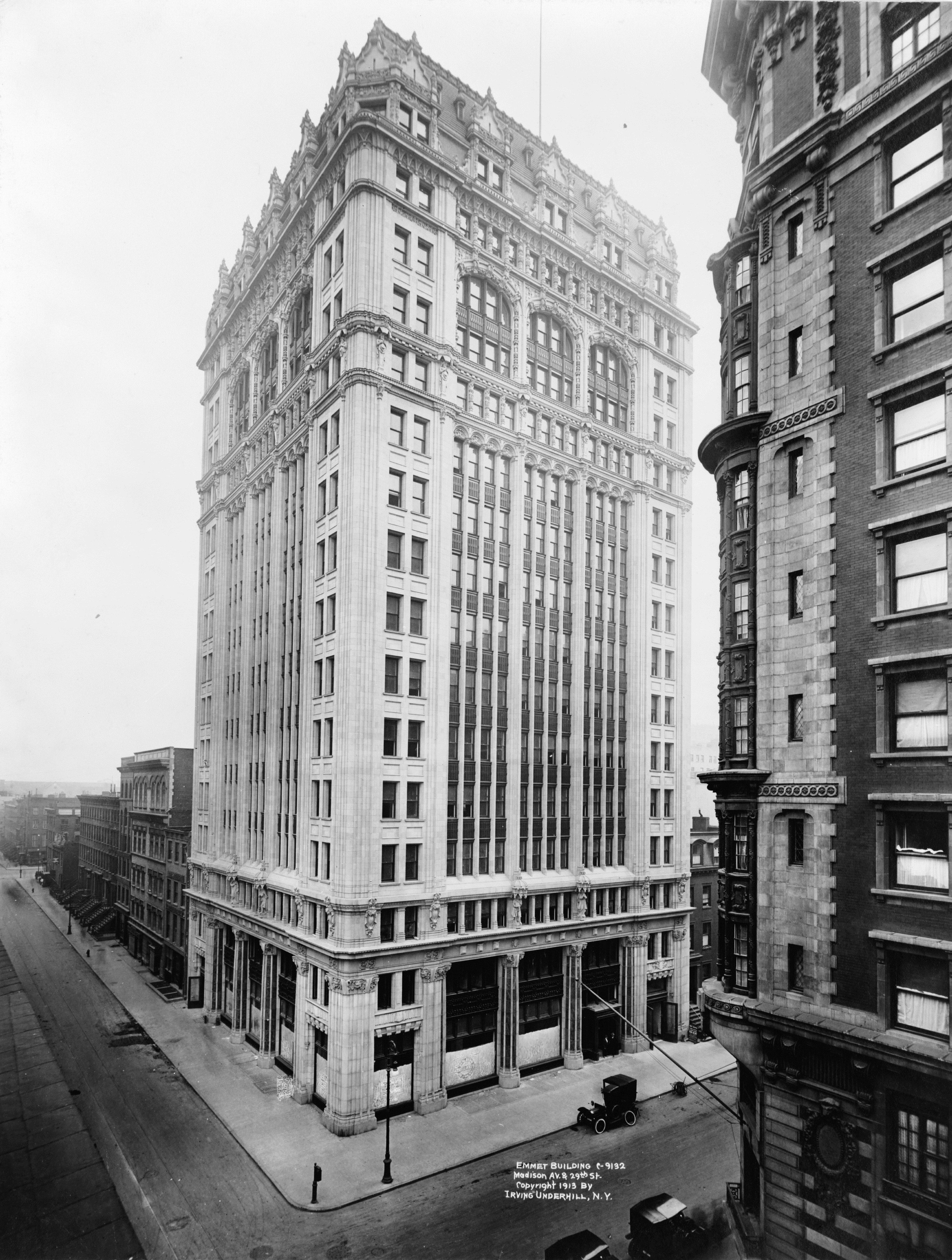
Emmet Building in 1913

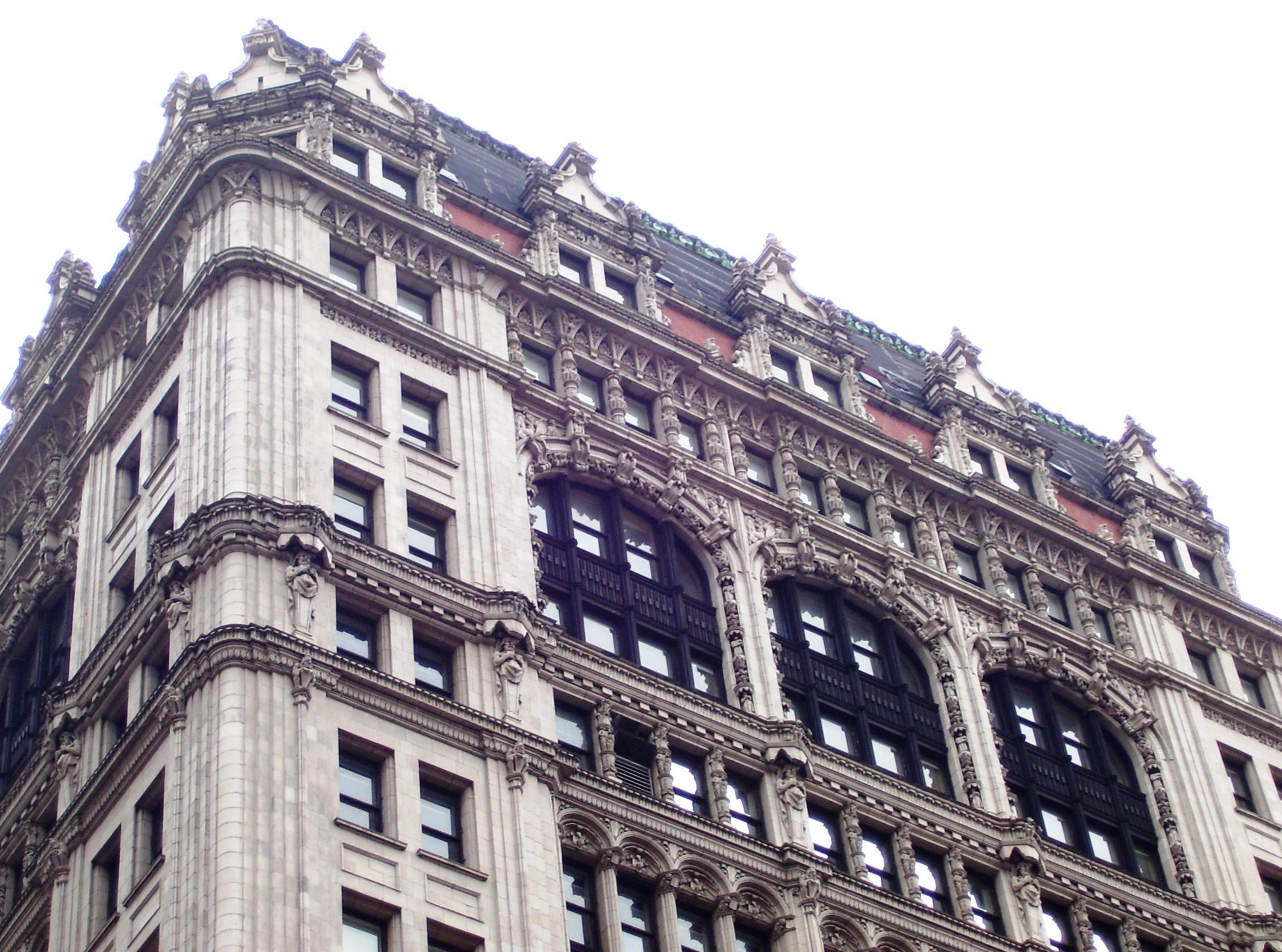
Emmet Building detail

The sixteen-story Emmet Building was built between 1911 and 1912 at 95 Madison Avenue in Manhattan, New York City. There is also a second entrance at 26 East 29th Street. Colt designed this skyscraper in partnership with John Stewart Barney for Dr. Thomas Addis Emmet, a prominent gynecological surgeon. The building included commercial spaces and wholesale showrooms, as well as the penthouse residence and roof gardens of Emmet and his family.

The design combined the then-modern steel-frame construction with ornamentation in the French Renaissance style, against an overall Gothic Revival style structure. The lower three stories are faced with Indiana limestone veneers that are decorated with widely spaced green marble columns inlaid with limestone stripes and capped with composite Corinthian capitals surrounded by cartouches, gargoyles, and medieval figures. The upper stories are finished in grey and olive green terracotta, and the middle ten-stories have projecting vertical pilasters with cast iron spandrels decorated with scroll and shield motifs.

The Emmet Building's ornamentation was notable because Barney & Colt tested the limits of terracotta and the skills of the sculptors by calling for "larger-than standard pieces", The crown of the building consists of five-stories "liberally encrusted with Renaissance motifs including baluster columns, elaborate cornices, foliate friezes, grotesques, console brackets, herms, and a mansard roof with stepped dormers." The roof was originally covered with red tile. The New York City Landmark Preservation Commission says, "The building’s emphasis on verticality and its extravagant terracotta decoration are emblematic of the New York City skyscraper style at the turn of the 20th-century."

Barney & Colt also thought the terracotta was significant, but for different reasons. They wrote, "The use of the terra cotta in this building requires particular and favorable comment, in that no attempt has been made to disguise the nature of the material, which is frankly a fireproofing for the steel work within." The marketing materials for the Emmet Building promoted its fireproofing, higher-than-usual ceilings, wide-set columns, and modern HVAC and electrical systems. Other fire safety elements included a masonry-enclosed fire escape that was accessible on each floor.

It is believed that this was the first New York City skyscraper to include a residence, other than a janitor's quarters. Designing a skyscraper to meet the exacting demands of Dr. Emmet's residence was an interesting challenge for Barney & Colt, as they had to mix commercial practically with the distinctive architectural style a wealthy client desires for their home. They used the entire top floor for the penthouse and its gardens. The penthouse included French doors to balconies, bedrooms with adjourning bathrooms, a breakfast room, a conservatory, a dining room, kitchens, a laundry room, a library, a study, a swimming pool, and servants' quarters. The hallways had Dutch tile flooring. The library was significant in size as Emmet collected books; it featured oak cabinets framed in blue and white Holland tiles, as well as a traditional iron grate. The main rooms opened to the rooftop garden with fountains, a pergola, and a solarium. As one period writer noted, the penthouse was "perfect to detail, intended for the discerning owner of this magnificent property."

In addition to the well-appointed penthouse, Emmet spared no expense on the spaces for his tenants. As a result, there was "an extensive and refreshing variety of decorations". The main entrance to the building featured various imported marbles and elevators with bronze fronts. Barney & Colt designed its light fixtures that ranged from ornate and artistic chandeliers to incandescent fixtures with simple shades. They even designed the roof to hide the water tanks, boiler flues, ventilation, and other "such unsightly things". For each tenant, Barney & Colt included private stairs, separate freight and passenger elevators, separate freight entrances, and mail chutes in each loft—leading to the Emmet Building being called "a building within a building".

The American Institute of Architects called the Emmet building "a terra cotta neo-Renaissance confection". It has been designated a New York City Landmark and is also located in the Madison Square North Historic District.

=== Arthur C. James Carriage House ===
In 1913, Arthur Curtiss James hired Barney & Colt to redesign his carriage house and stables at 147 East 69th Street. James was a railroad magnate and amongst the elite few who could afford a private carriage house in New York City. When automobiles became common, the carriage house was converted into a garage and chauffeur's residence. In 1988, the carriage house was converted into a single-family residence. Now considered a mansion, the former carriage house is part of the Upper East Side Historic District.

== Professional affiliations ==
Colt was a member of the American Institute of Architects, the Architectural League of New York, the New Jersey Society of Architects, and the Union County Society of Architects. He was also a founding director of the Society of Columbia University Architects.

He was active in the New Jersey Chapter of the American Institute of Architects. In 1911, Colt was chairman of the committee that organized an annual exhibition at the Newark Free Public Library which featured New Jersey's best architecture of the past two years. He was elected its vice president in 1917. Also in 1917, he chaired the group's committee to improve the appearance of Lincoln Highway.

Colt was in charge of a poster contest for an Industrial Exposition held by the Elizabeth Board of Trade in Elizabeth, New Jersey in 1913. In 1919, Colt was appointed to an Architects Committee to assist the State of New Jersey and its cities with memorials for soldiers.

== Personal ==
Colt married Beatrice "Betty" Waldberg Barclay (1875-1967), a niece of James Lent Barclay in Cazenovia, New York on October 9, 1901. They had three sons and two daughters: Stockton Beekman Colt Jr. (born 1902), Rutger Barclay Colt (1903-1969), Beatrice Boudinot Colt (born 1905), Cornelia Cochrane Colt (born 1907), and Sackett Barclay Colt (born 1912).

He belonged to the St. Anthony Club of New York and the Union County Historical Society. He was also a member of Trinity Church in Elizabeth, New Jersey, for more than 35 years.

After a long illness, Colt died in his home at 910 Salem Avenue in Elizabeth, New Jersey, in 1937.
