= Holy Trinity Church, St. Christopher House and Parsonage =

Episcopal church in Manhattan, New York

- U.S. National Register of Historic Places
- New York State Register of Historic Places
- New York City Landmark
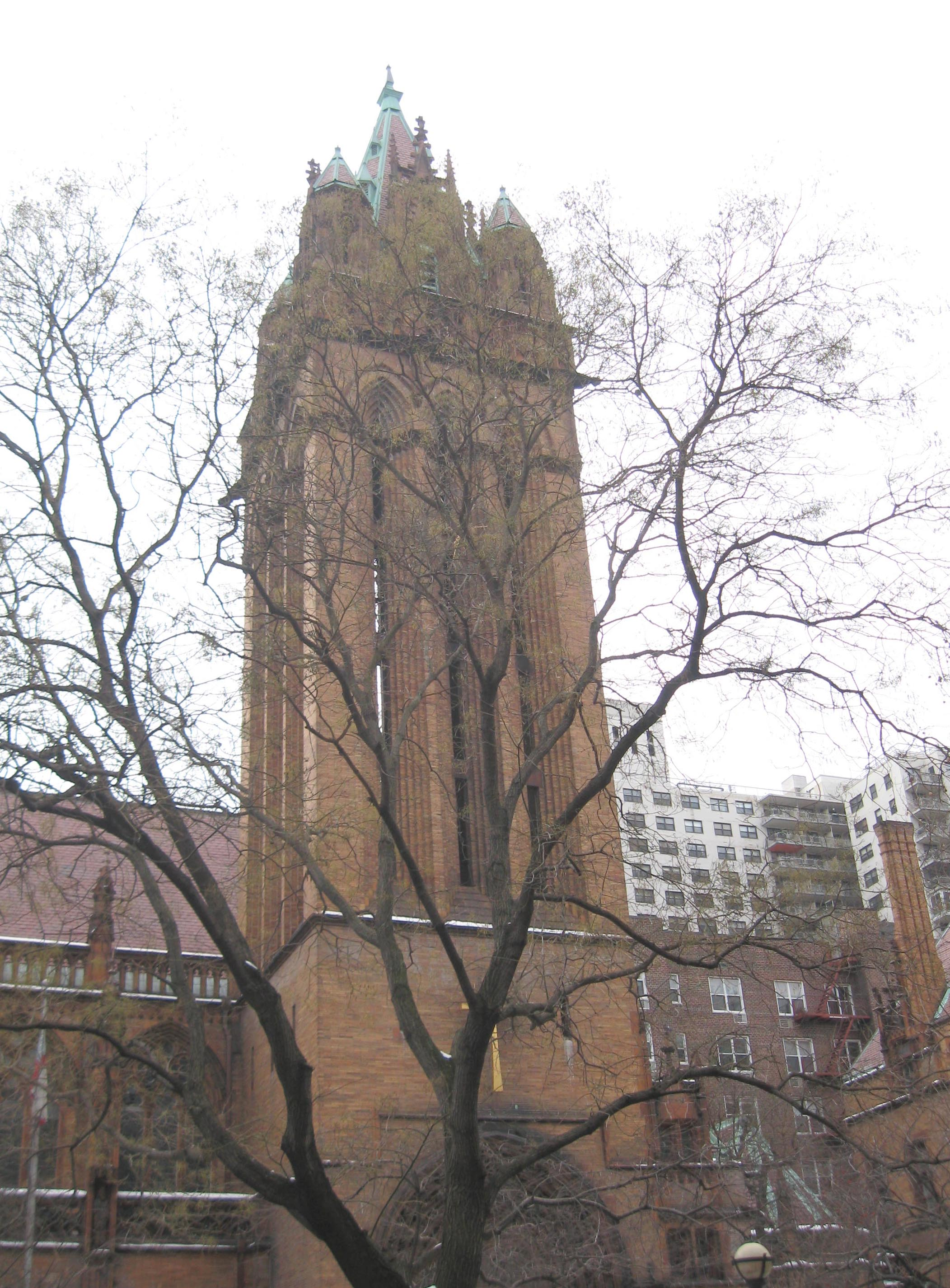
- Holy Trinity Church, St. Christopher House and Parsonage in 2009.

- Location within New York City Location within New York Location within the United States
- Location: 312–316 and 332 East 88th Street, New York, New York
- Coordinates: 40°46′42″N 73°56′58.5″W
- Area: less than one acre
- Built: 1897
- Architect: Barney and Chapman
- Architectural style: French Gothic Revival
- NRHP reference No.: 80002694
- NYSRHP No.: 06101.000410, 06101.003323
- NYCL No.: 0446

Significant dates
- Added to NRHP: May 30, 1980
- Designated NYSRHP: June 23, 1980
- Designated NYCL: February 15, 1967

The Holy Trinity Church, St. Christopher House and Parsonage is a historic Episcopal church located at 312-316 and 332 East 88th Street on the Upper East Side of Manhattan in New York City. The building was built in 1897.

It was added to the National Register of Historic Places in 1980.

== See also ==
- National Register of Historic Places listings in Manhattan from 59th to 110th Streets
- List of New York City Designated Landmarks in Manhattan from 59th to 110th Streets
