= Trowbridge & Livingston =

American architectural firm (1897–1925)

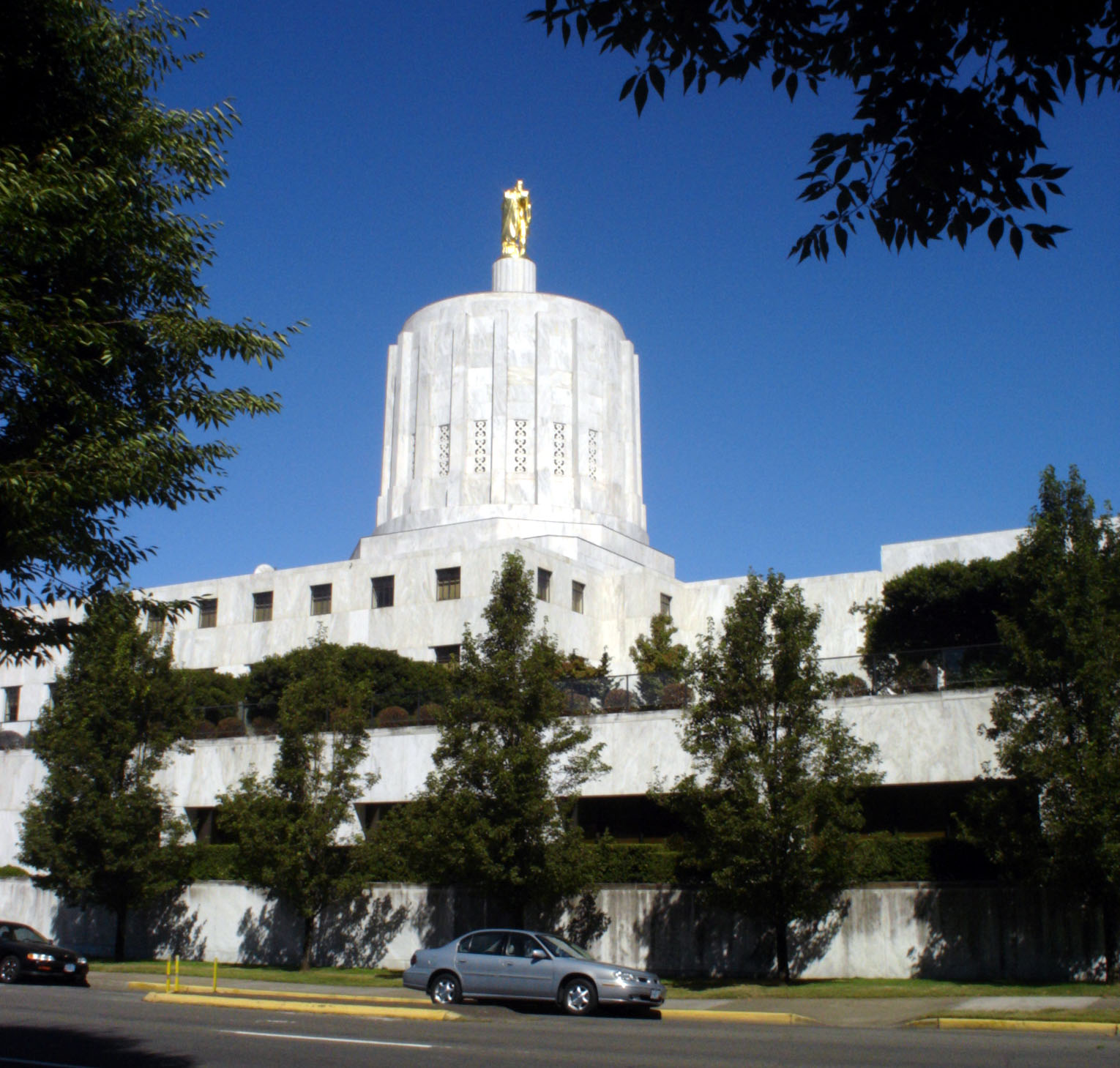
- The Oregon State Capitol

Practice information
- Founders: Breck Trowbridge; Goodhue Livingston
- Founded: 1897
- Dissolved: 1925
- Location: New York City, New York, U.S.
- Affiliations: Trowbridge, Colt & Livingston

Trowbridge & Livingston was an architecture firm based in New York City, active from 1897 to 1925. The firm's partners were Breck Trowbridge and Goodhue Livingston. They were successors to the firm Trowbridge, Colt & Livingston, founded in 1894 but dissolved in 1897 when Stockton B. Colt left the partnership.

Often commissioned by well-heeled clients, much of the firm's work was built on the Upper East Side and Financial District neighborhoods of New York. The firm became known for its commercial, civic, and institutional buildings. Many of these buildings were designed in a Beaux Arts or neoclassical style. Some examples are the B. Altman and Company Building (1905), J. P. Morgan Building (1913), and the Oregon State Capitol (1938).

== Biographies of the partners ==
=== Breck Trowbridge ===
Samuel Breck Parkman Trowbridge was born in New York City on May 20, 1862. He was the fourth of eight children born to William Petit Trowbridge and Lucy Parkman Trowbridge. His father was a military engineer who oversaw construction of Fort Totten Battery and repairs to Fort Schuyler during the American Civil War. After the war, his father became a professor of mechanical engineering at Yale's Sheffield Scientific School in 1871, then at the Columbia School of Mines in 1877.

Samuel Trowbridge graduated in 1883 from Trinity College in Hartford, Connecticut, and in 1886 from Columbia University's School of Architecture. After further study abroad at the American School of Classical Studies in Athens and at the École des Beaux-Arts in Paris, he returned to New York where he worked in the office of George B. Post for four years. He then began practicing in partnership from 1894 with Livingston and Stockton B. Colt, and from 1897 with Livingston, after Colt left the firm. Trowbridge died of pneumonia at his home in New York City on January 29, 1925.

=== Goodhue Livingston ===
Goodhue Livingston was born in New York City on February 23, 1867, the son of Robert Edward Livingston and his wife, Susan DePeyster. Goodhue graduated from Columbia College (1888), and from Columbia University's School of Mines (1892).

== Firm activity ==
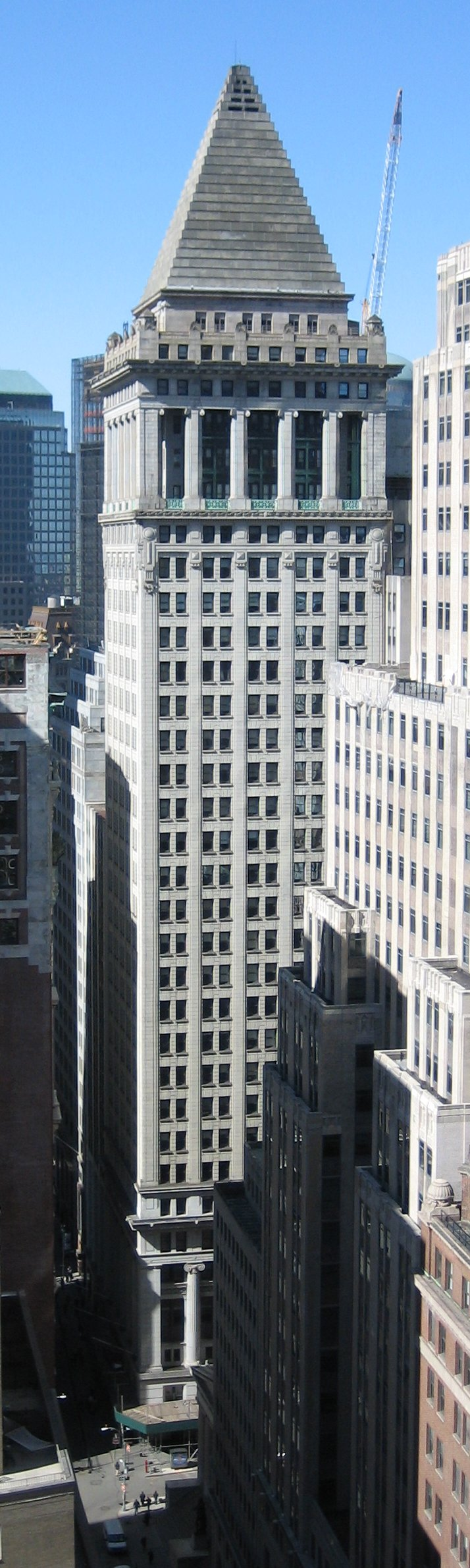
14 Wall Street in Lower Manhattan

In 1894, Trowbridge, Livingston and Colt formed a partnership that lasted until 1897 when Stockton B. Colt left, and the firm became Trowbridge & Livingston.

Its major commissions were received between 1901 and 1938, most in a Beaux Arts or neoclassical style. The majority of the firm's work was in New York City, where the firm designed several notable public and commercial buildings. Among the most famous are the neo-Baroque St. Regis New York (1904). and the B. Altman and Company Building (1906), both on Fifth Avenue. In particular, nearly all of the buildings at the intersection of Wall, Broad, and Nassau Streets in Manhattan's Financial District were designed by the firm: 14 Wall Street (1912), the Bankers Trust Building on the northwest corner; 11 Wall Street (1922), the New York Stock Exchange Annex on the southwest corner; and 23 Wall Street (1913) and 15 Broad Street (1927), the J. P. Morgan & Co. Building on the southwest corner.

Their practice extended to townhouses on Manhattan's Upper East Side, of which 41 East 65 Street (1910), 11 East 91st Street and 49 East 68th Street (1914) remain. The New York Society Library, a lending library with a long genteel tradition in New York, moved into the former John Rogers House at 53 East 79th Street.

== Projects ==
=== New York City projects ===
- The Nathaniel L. McCready House (1896)
- 123 East 63rd Street (1900)
- St. Regis New York (1901–1904), 2 East 55th Street (NYC Landmark)
- 123 East 70th Street (1902–1903)
- The Knickerbocker Hotel (1902–1906), 1462–1470 Broadway (NYC Landmark and NRHP-listed)
- The Links Club (1902), 36 East 62nd Street
- B. Altman and Company Building (1905), 351–57 Fifth Avenue (NYC Landmark)
- Engine Company 7, Ladder Company 1, FDNY (1905), 100 Duane Street (NYC Landmark)
- John B. and Caroline Trevor House (1909–1911), 11 East 91st Street (NYC Landmark)
- Benson Bennett Sloan House (1910), 41 East 65th Street
- Bankers Trust Company (1910–1912), 14 Wall Street (NYC Landmark)
- J.P. Morgan & Company Building (1913), 23 Wall Street (NYC Landmark and NRHP-listed)
- J. William and Margaretta C. Clark House (1913–1914), 49 East 68th Street (NYC Landmark)
- New York Society Library (1917), 53 East 79th Street (NYC Landmark)
- Extension to the New York Stock Exchange Building (1923), 8 Broad Street (NRHP-listed)
- American Museum of Natural History southeast extension (1912–1924), West 77th Street and Central Park West
- 44 Wall Street (1927)
- 15 Broad Street (1928)
- The Hayden Planetarium (1935) at the American Museum of Natural History, West 81st Street and Central Park West

=== Projects outside New York City ===
- Bixby Memorial Free Library, (1911), Vergennes, Vermont
- Jordanville Public Library (1907–1908), Jordanville, New York, NRHP-listed
- St. Elizabeth's Memorial Chapel (1921), Tuxedo, New York
- The Gulf Building, now Gulf Tower (1932), Pittsburgh, Pennsylvania, in association with Edward Mellon;
- The Oregon State Capitol (1936–38) in Salem, in association with Francis Keally, NRHP-listed
- American National Red Cross, 17th and D Sts., NW Washington, D.C. Trowbridge & Livingston, NRHP-listed
- United States Post Office and Courthouse, Jct. of 7th and Grant Streets. Pittsburgh, Pennsylvania Trowbridge & Livingston, NRHP-listed
