= John Stewart Barney =

American architect and painter (1869-1925)

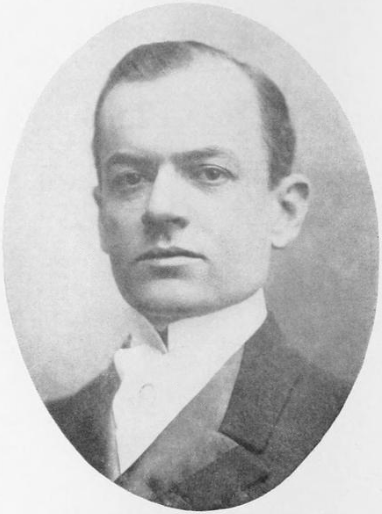
- Born: October 12, 1867; Richmond, Virginia, US
- Died: November 22, 1925 (aged 58); New York, New York, US
- Education: Columbia University; Ecole des Beaux Arts
- Occupations: Architect, painter
- Children: John Stewart Barney Jr.

John Stewart Barney (October 12, 1867 - November 22, 1925) was an American architect and painter in New York City. His partnerships included Barney and Chapman and Barney & Colt, the firm responsible for the Emmet Building. Among his extant designs are the Victor Emanuel estate, Dorwood, in Manhasset, New York.

== Biography ==
Barney was born in Richmond, Virginia and studied at Columbia University and the Ecole des Beaux Arts in Paris, France.

Barney partnered with Chapman no later than 1892. He was involved with the restoration of Colonial Williamsburg and drew up plans for the restoration of the Bruton Parish Church in 1904 on a pro bono basis. He designed the Emmet Building at 95 Madison Avenue in association with Stockton B. Colt and it was completed in 1912. It became a New York City Landmark in 2018.

In 1915 Barney quit architecture and concentrated on fine art painting. He died in New York City on November 22, 1925.

== Family ==
His son, John Stewart Barney Jr. (circa 1905 - 1964), was an artist in New York City. He married a woman named Winchester and divorced in 1929. In 1931 he married Helen G. Hackett Keech in a second marriage for both. They divorced in 1937.
