= Immaculate Conception Church (Bronx) =

Catholic church in Bronx, New York City

Coordinates: 40°52′34.9″N 73°51′51.8″W

The Church of the Immaculate Conception
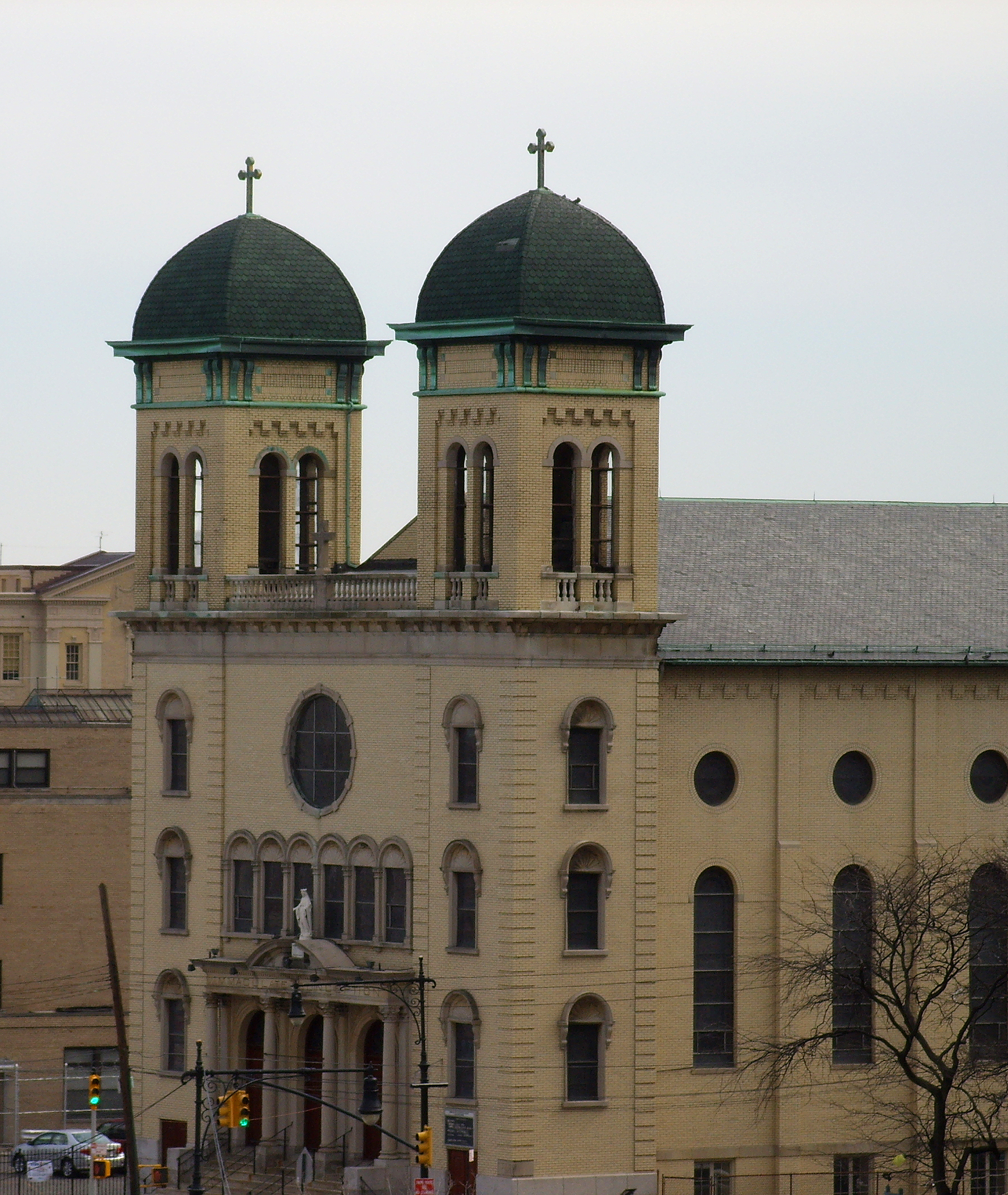
- Immaculate Conception Church on Gun Hill Rd.
- Interactive map of the The Church of the Immaculate Conception area

General information
- Architectural style: Italianate / Neo-Romanesque
- Location: Williamsbridge, Bronx, New York City, New York, United States
- Construction started: 1902 (first church)
- Completed: 1905 (first church); 1925 (present church)
- Client: Roman Catholic Archdiocese of New York

Technical details
- Structural system: Masonry brick

The Church of the Immaculate Conception is a Catholic parish church under the authority of the Archdiocese of New York. It is located at 754 Gun Hill Road, Williamsbridge, Bronx, New York City. The parish was established in 1902–1903 and is currently run by Capuchin friars.

== Parish history ==
An Immaculate Conception parish church was around in 1892 for the German community, located at 151st Street, near Third Avenue. That, and other Immaculate Conceptions (on Manhattan's 14th Street and in Queens) are not connected with this parish.

In December 1902, Cardinal John Farley assigned to Fr Joseph Cirincione the task of founded Immaculate Conception for the Italians of the neighborhood. In November 1903, Fr Patrick J. Lennon succeeded in the pastorate and began the work of building a church, which was contributed to by Farley, Msgr Michael J. Lavelle, and the Jesuits of St. Ignatius Church and St. Francis Xavier Church. The first church structure was dedicated October 8, 1905. It is situated on the corner of Maple and Briggs Avenues."

The third pastor (appointed in 1906), Fr Contantino Cassaneti, was chaplain on the public work of the Croton Dam, and had the temporary chapels of St. Michael and St. Mary's erected at Peekskill Quarry, New York, on the suggestion of the contractor and builder J. J. Coleman.

In 1914, "the congregation number[ed] about 1,500, and the value of the church property is estimated at $23,000."

On December 23, 1923, the previous structure burned. The present Italianate - Neo-Romanesque brick twin-towered church, across Gun Hill Road from the previous church, was built in 1925, designed by architect Joseph Ziccardi.

The rectory address is 754 East Gun Hill Road, Bronx NY 10467.

== Priests ==
- Fr Joseph Cirincione (1902-1903)
- Fr Patrick J. Lennon (1903-1906)
- Fr Contantino Cassaneti (March 25, 1906-?)
- Fr Robert Grix (1980s-1990s)
- Fr John LoSasso (ca. 1996)
- Fr John Aurilia

== Immaculate Conception Catholic Elementary School ==
The parochial elementary school opened in 1950. As of 2011, it was staffed by fourteen religious sisters and lay faculty members. From 2013 to 2024, the school was operated by the Partnership for Inner-City Education, a nonprofit group assisting struggle Catholic schools. Their contract with the Archdiocese of New York ended in 2024. in January 2025, the school was slated for closure.
