= Church of the Immaculate Conception and Clergy Houses =

Historic church in Manhattan, New York

- Church of the Immaculate Conception and Clergy House
- U.S. National Register of Historic Places
- New York State Register of Historic Places
- New York City Landmark
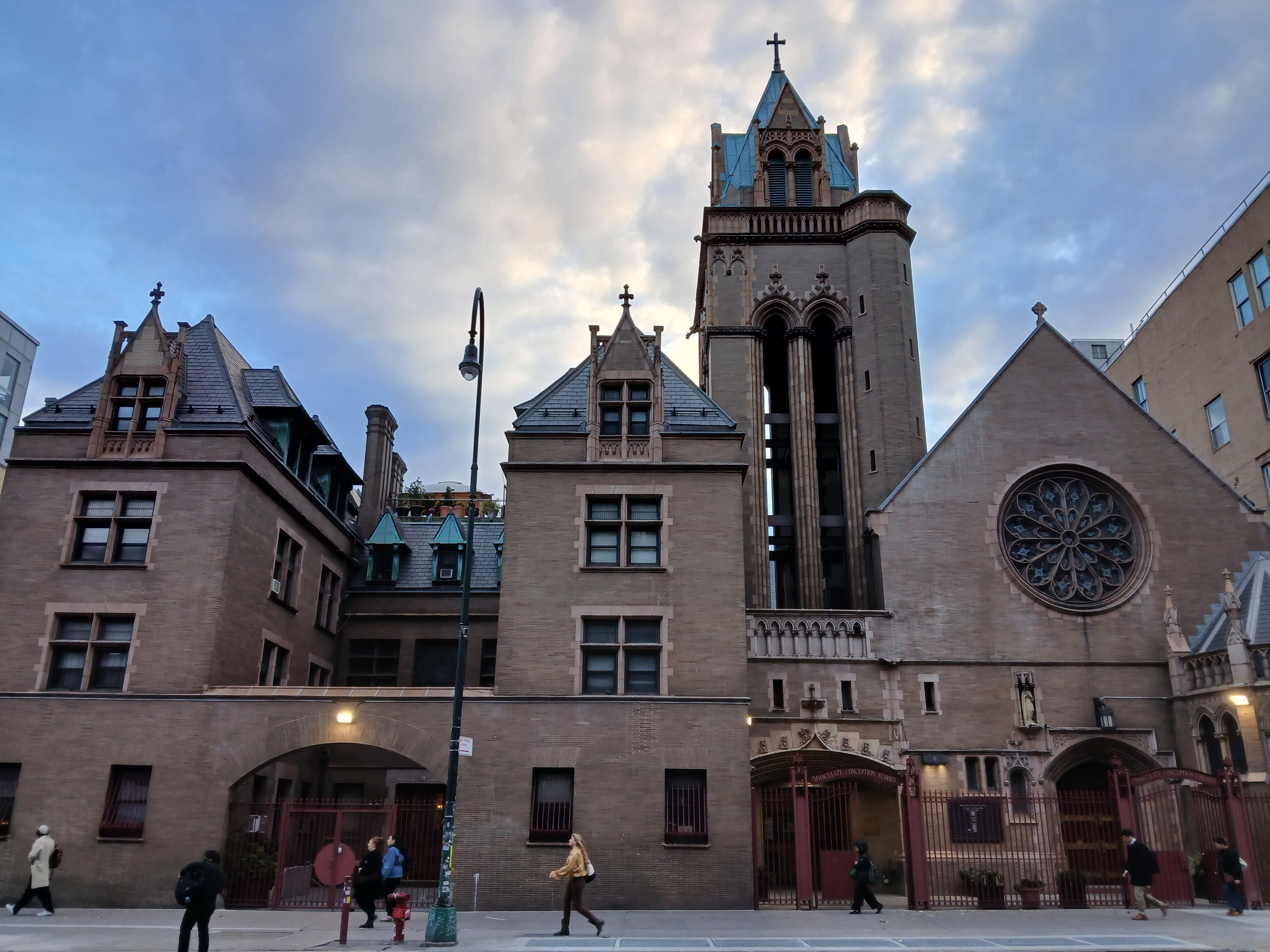
- (2025)

- Location within New York City Location within New York Location within the United States
- Location: 406–414 E. 14th St., New York, New York
- Coordinates: 40°43′51″N 73°58′56″W
- Built: 1894–1896
- Architect: Barney and Chapman
- Architectural style: French Gothic Revival
- NRHP reference No.: 80002681
- NYSRHP No.: 06101.001682
- NYCL No.: 0226, 0227

Significant dates
- Added to NRHP: March 28, 1980
- Designated NYSRHP: June 23, 1980
- Designated NYCL: June 7, 1966

The Church of the Immaculate Conception and Clergy House at 406–412 East 14th Street between First Avenue and Avenue A in the East Village neighborhood of Manhattan, New York City were built in 1894–1896 by Grace Church, one of the most prominent Episcopal churches in the city at the time. The buildings were a free chapel – meaning there was no pew rent – called Grace Chapel and a connected Grace Hospital, which could serve 16 senior citizens and 10 children, and was physically connected to the chapel by a bridge, so that patients could be wheeled to services.

They were designed by Barney and Chapman in French Gothic style. The firm was working at the same time on the Church of the Holy Trinity in Yorkville, which was also designed in the same style. Grace Chapel has stained-glass windows by Clayton & Bell and Henry Holiday. In 1943 both buildings were sold to the Roman Catholic Archdiocese of New York, and were converted for the use of the Immaculate Conception Church, founded in 1855, as a sanctuary and Clergy House.

The buildings were designated a New York City landmark in 1966, and were added to the National Register of Historic Places in 1980.

== See also ==
- List of New York City Designated Landmarks in Manhattan below 14th Street
- National Register of Historic Places listings in Manhattan below 14th Street
