= Barney and Chapman =

Muthu Mariamman Temple Adavallikuthan

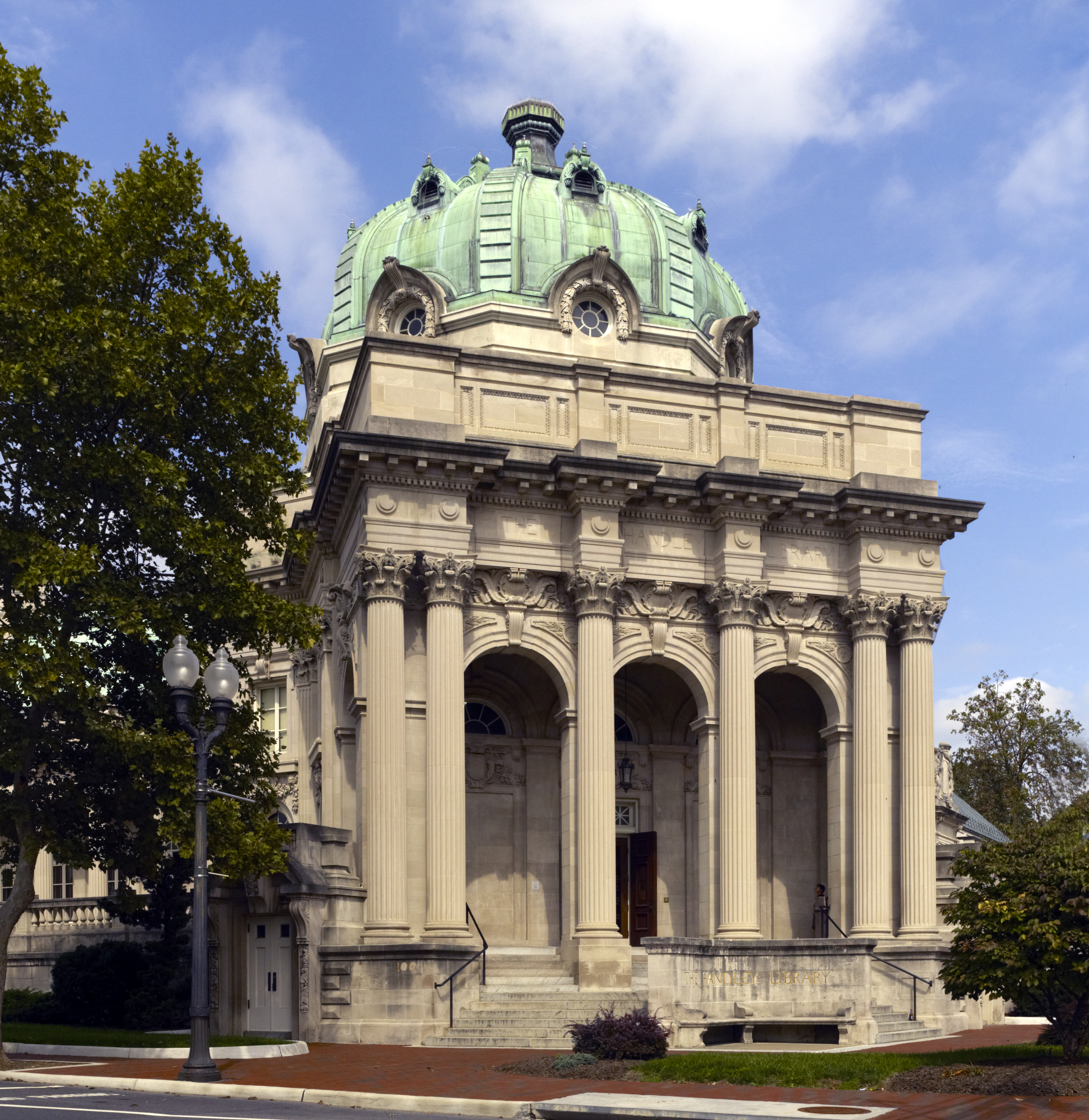
Handley Library in Winchester, Virginia

Barney and Chapman was an American architecture firm based in New York, active from about 1892 through 1908. The partnership designed significant municipal buildings, churches, private estates, and an asylum complex for the state of New York.

== John Stewart Barney ==
John Stewart Barney (October 12, 1867 - Nov 22 1925) was born in Richmond, Virginia and studied at Columbia University and the Ecole des Beaux Arts in Paris. Barney partnered with Chapman no later than 1892. Barney was also involved with the restoration of Colonial Williamsburg, for instance drawing up plans for the restoration of the Bruton Parish Church in 1904 on a pro bono basis.

He also designed the Emmet Building (1912) at 95 Madison Avenue in association with S. R. Colt.

From 1915 Barney quit architecture and concentrated on fine art painting. John Stewart Barney Jr. was his son.

=== Henry Otis Chapman ===
Henry Otis Chapman (1862–1929) was born in Otisville, New York, educated at Cornell, and was in private practice before partnering with Barney. After the partnership ended in 1908, Chapman practiced as a solo architect and as Henry Chapman & Son. Among his later works are the United States Mortgage and Trust Company Building at 940 Madison Avenue, completed in 1921, as of 2016 an Apple store.

== Work ==
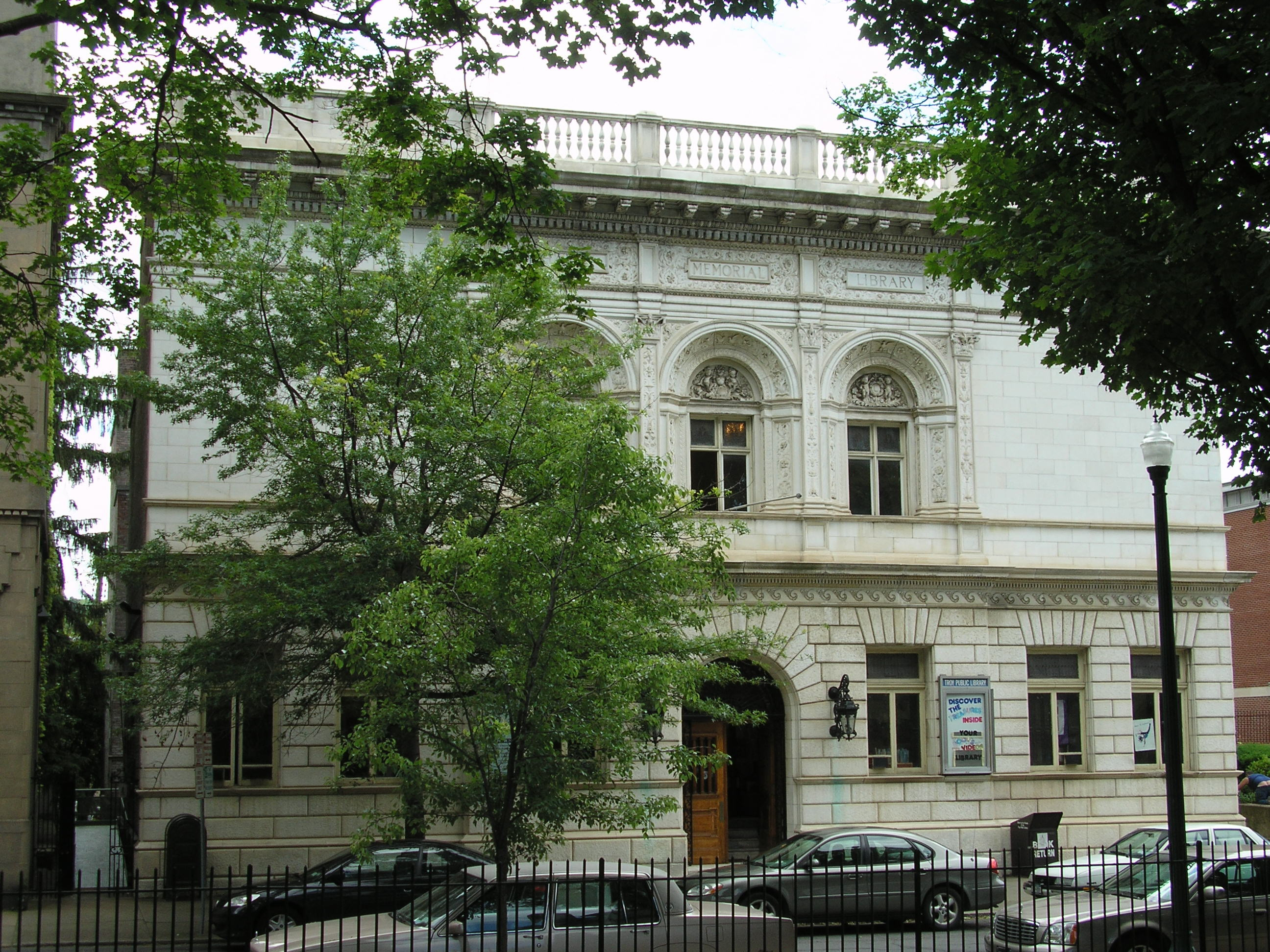
Troy Public Library

Barney and Chapman's commissions include:

- Grace Chapel, since 1943 the Church of the Immaculate Conception, 415-419 East 13th Street, 1894–96
- Revillon Building, NYC, 1896
- Hart Memorial Building (Troy Public Library), Troy, New York, 1897
- Holy Trinity Church, 88th Street, Manhattan, NYC, 1899
- Hotel Navarre, 7th Avenue and 38th Street, NYC, opened October 1900 (razed 1925)
- All Saints Episcopal Church, Richmond, Virginia, 1901 (razed 1963)
- a complex of buildings for the Thomas Indian School, completed 1901
- Broadway Tabernacle for the Broadway United Church of Christ, Broadway and 56th Street, 1903-05 (razed 1969)
- Hudson Rose Residence, Longue Vue Island, Alexandria, New York, 1906
- Handley Library, Winchester, Virginia, begun 1908, completed 1913
- William H. Van Der Poel Residence Woodstock, Muttontown, Oyster Bay NY
