= Immaculate Conception Church (Manhattan) =

Roman Catholic parish church in Manhattan, New York City

Coordinates: 40°43′51.3″N 73°58′55.7″W

The Church of the Immaculate Conception
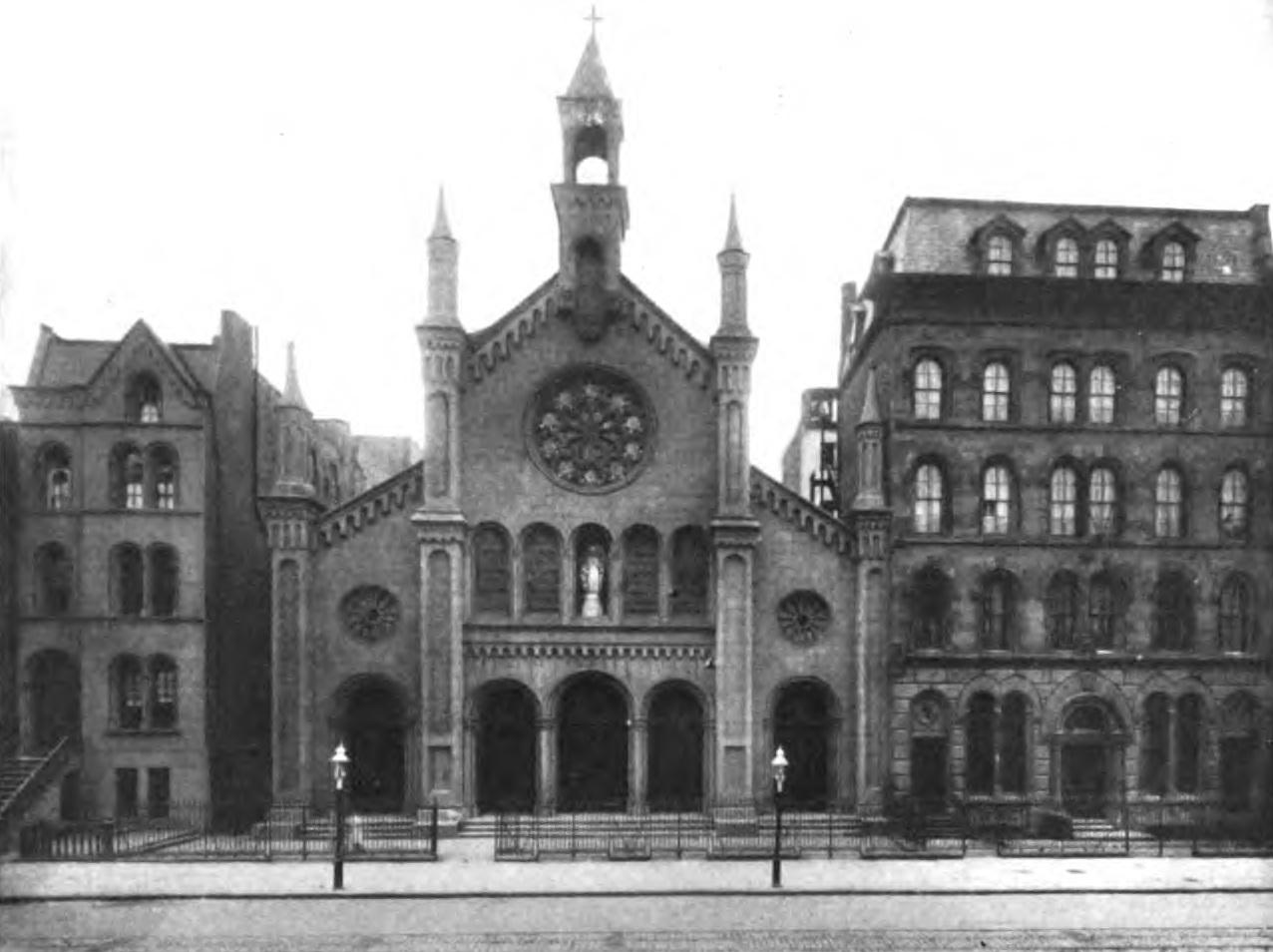
- Former church building in 1914
- Interactive map of the The Church of the Immaculate Conception area

General information
- Location: New York, New York, United States of America
- Completed: 1858
- Cost: $700,000 (for 1945 convent and school)
- Client: Roman Catholic Archdiocese of New York

Design and construction
- Architects: Eggers & Higgins (for 1945 convent and school)

Website
- Immaculate Conception Church, Manhattan

The Church of the Immaculate Conception is a parish church in the Roman Catholic Archdiocese of New York, located at 414 East 14th Street, near First Avenue, Manhattan, New York City, and previously at 505 East 14th Street.

== History ==
The parish was established in 1855, when a temporary church was established in a carpenter's shop on 15th Street by Rev. Bernard Farrell. The congregation was largely Irish and Italian immigrants who had settled on the East Side. Farrell resigned due to failing health, and his successor, Rev. John Ryan had a new church constructed at 505 14th Street, which was dedicated by Archbishop Hughes in May 1858. Ryan was followed by Rev. William P. Morrogh, who established the parish school. The school opened in 1864, staffed by the Sisters of Charity of New York; the Christian Brothers arrived in 1880 and assumed instruction of the boys.

By the tenure of Monsignor John Edwards in 1875, Immaculate Conception was the largest parish in the city. In 1887, the church was consecrated by Archbishop Michael Corrigan. The church was the site of the 1891 funeral of Congressman Francis Barretto Spinola

When Msgr. William G. Murphy took over in 1906, Immaculate Conception was one of the largest in the archdiocese. The following decades saw a diminishing number of parishioners as members of the congregation moved to other parts of the city. The church was demolished in the 1940s to make way for Stuyvesant Town.

In 1943 the parish took over the chapel and hospital buildings now known as Church of the Immaculate Conception and Clergy Houses, completed in 1896 to designs by Barney and Chapman and formerly owned by Grace Church.

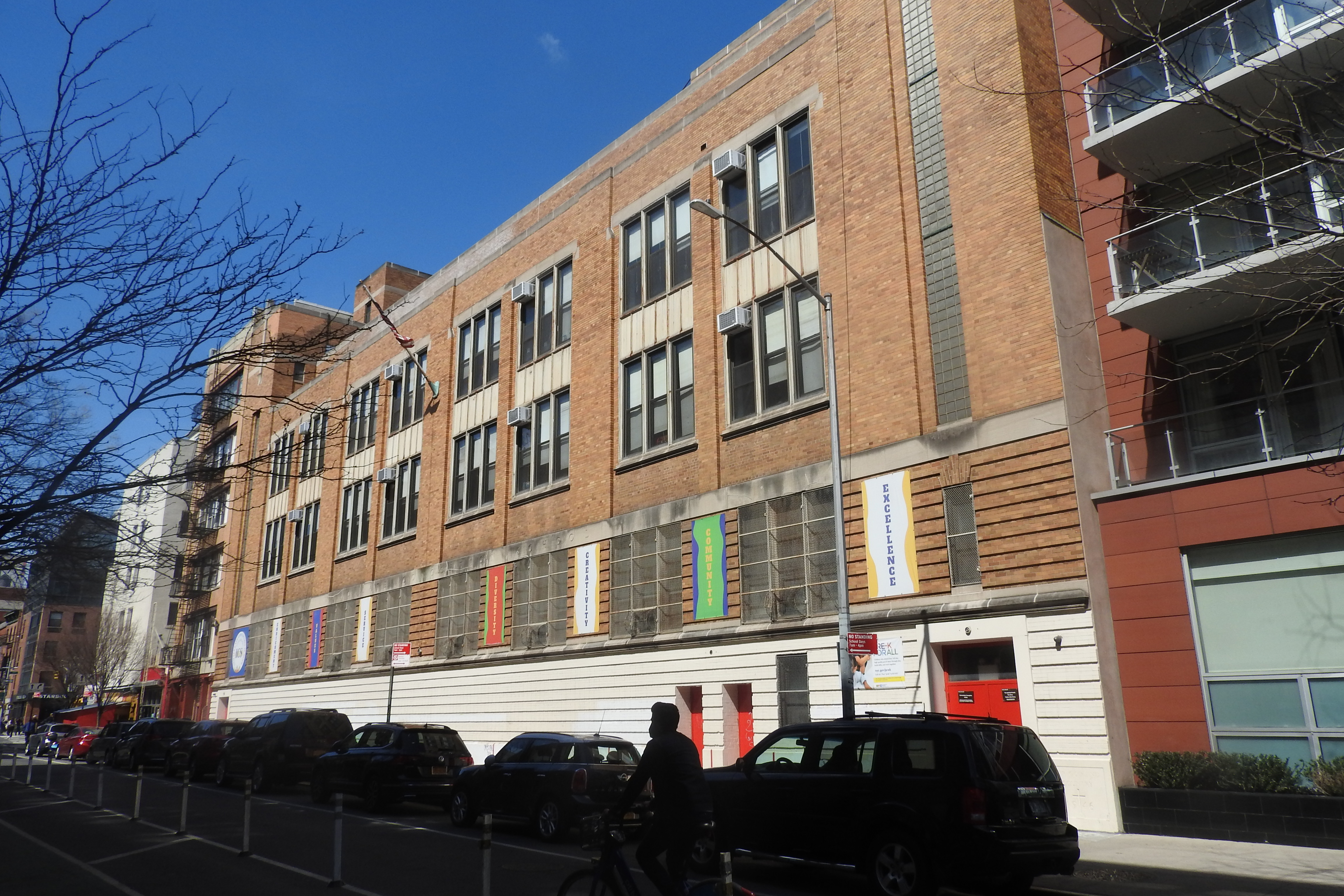
Immaculate Conception School, East 13th Street prior to closure (2021)

This existing facility was expanded with a four-storey brick convent and parochial school, at 415-419 East 13th Street and 414-416 East 14th Street, designed by Eggers & Higgins for $700,000, and completed in 1945. On February 16, 2023, the Archdiocese of New York announced that the school would close at the end of the current academic year due to falling enrollment levels and pandemic-related issues.

There is another church of the same name on Staten Island established in 1887, and a third in Ditmars, Astoria, Queens, and also Immaculate Conception Church (Bronx).
