= Edward Mellon =

American architect (1875–1953)

Edward Purcell Mellon (1875–1953) was an American architect active in Pittsburgh, Pennsylvania and a member of the wealthy Mellon family.

== Early life ==
Edward Purcell Mellon was born in 1875, the son of Thomas Alexander "Tom" Mellon (and grandson of Thomas Mellon founder of Mellon Bank), and his wife Mary C. Caldwell, the sister of Alexander Caldwell, U.S. Senator for Kansas. His brother was Thomas Alexander Mellon II.

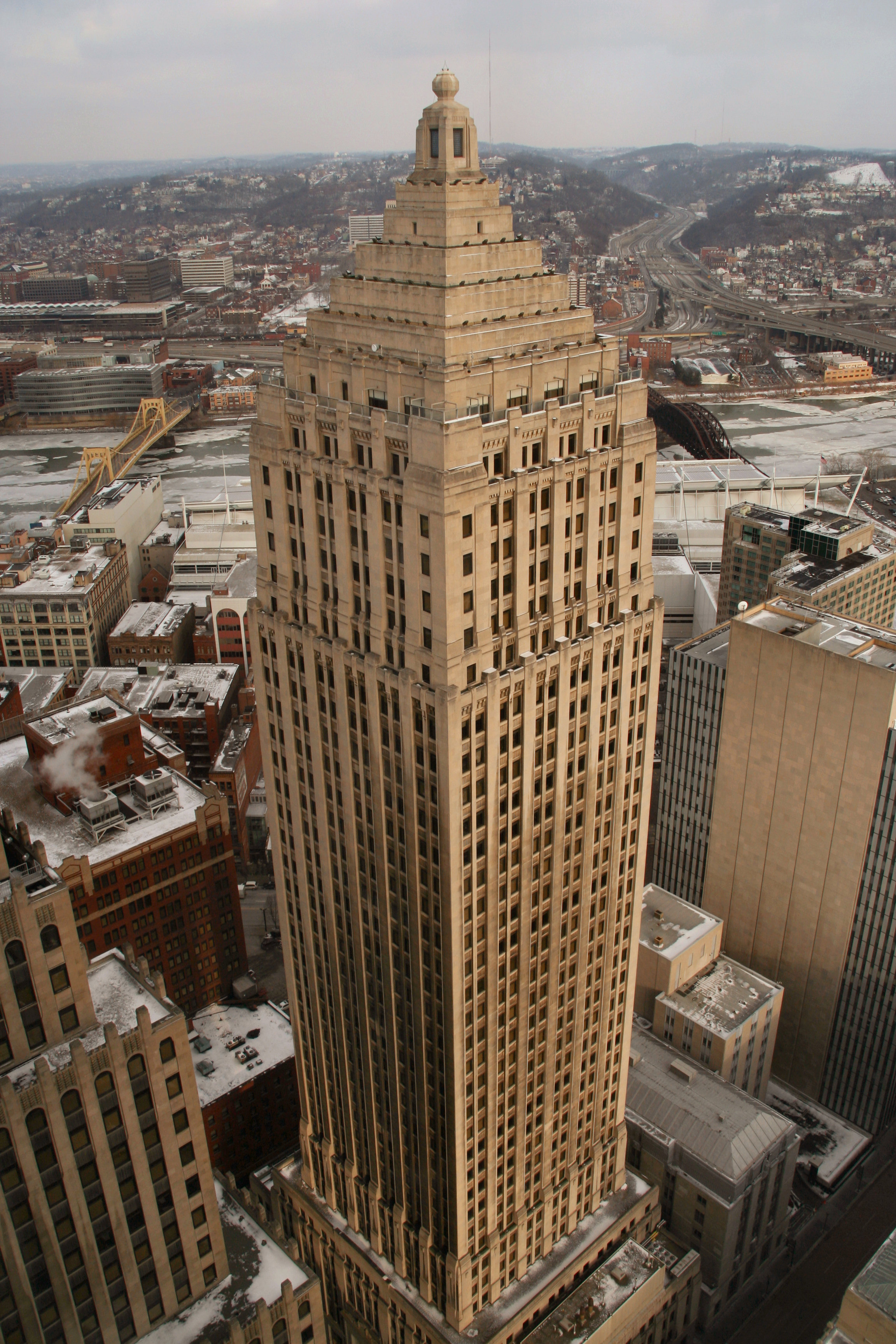
Gulf Tower, Pittsburgh

== Career ==
In 1919, he designed Villa Maria in Meadow Lane, Southampton, Long Island, New York, as a holiday home for his family.

In 1921, his uncles, Andrew W. Mellon and Richard B. Mellon, wanted him to design the main buildings, including what is now known as the Cathedral of Learning for the University of Pittsburgh for which they were the main benefactors. The new university chancellor John Gabbert Bowman thought Mellon's work was a "waste" but paid him, and eventually engaged Charles Klauder in February 1924.

== Notable buildings ==
- The Gulf Building, now Gulf Tower (1932), Pittsburgh, in association with Trowbridge & Livingston

== Personal life ==
In 1940, his daughter Jane Caldwell Mellon married the New York City lawyer Craigh Leonard.

== Death ==
Mellon died in 1953.
