= Gulf Tower =

Skyscraper in Pittsburgh

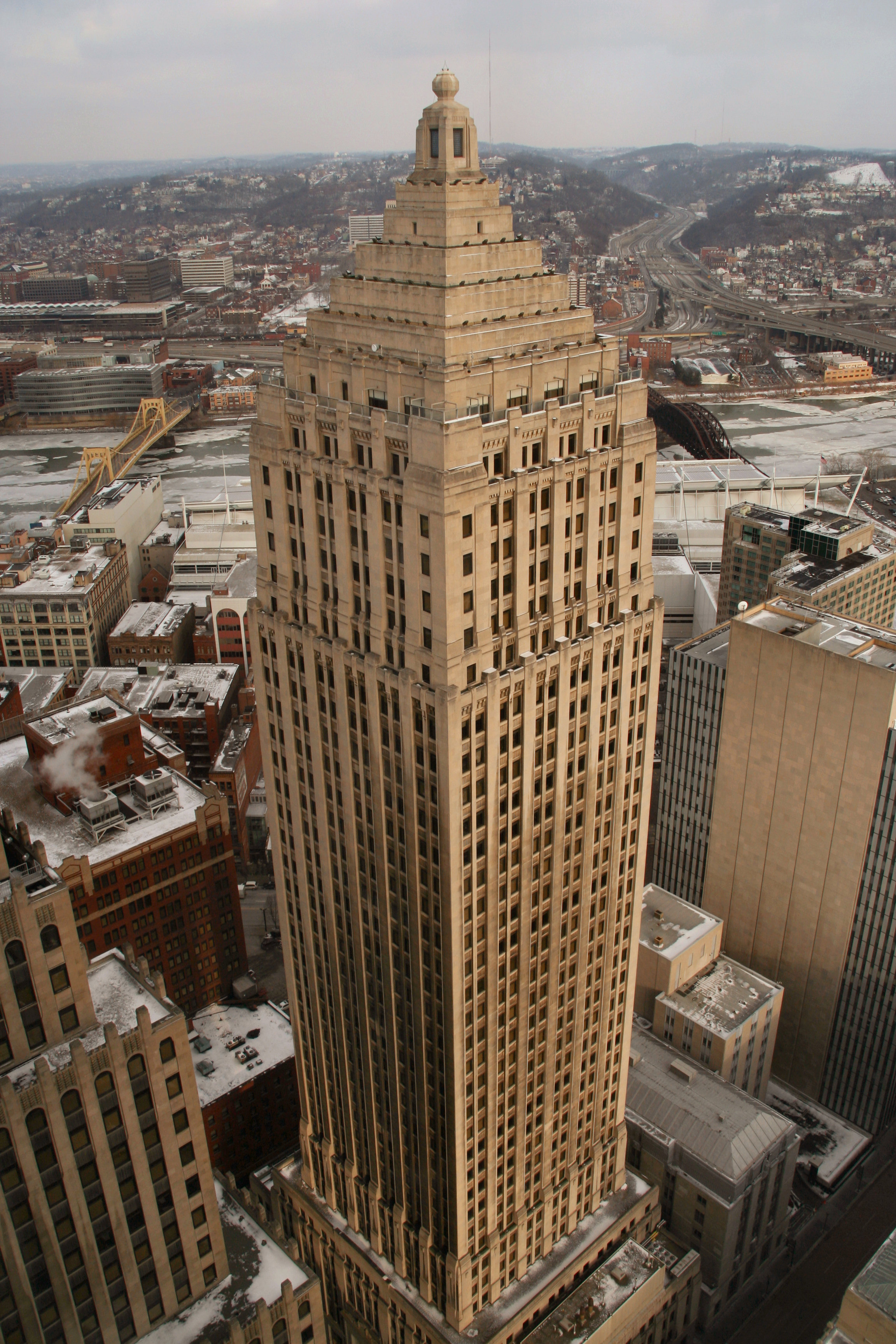
- Gulf Tower, from US Steel Tower, pictured January 31, 2007
- Interactive map of the Gulf Tower area

Record height
- Tallest in Pennsylvania from 1932 to 1971^{[I]}
- Preceded by: Philadelphia City Hall
- Surpassed by: U.S. Steel Tower

General information
- Type: Offices
- Architectural style: Art Deco
- Location: 707 Grant Street; Pittsburgh, Pennsylvania
- Coordinates: 40°26′33″N 79°59′43″W
- Construction started: 1930
- Completed: 1932
- Cost: US$10.05 million (1932) $193.7 million (today)

Height
- Roof: 177.4 m (582 ft)

Technical details
- Floor count: 44
- Floor area: 409,320 ft^{2} (38,027 m^{2})
- Lifts/elevators: 15

Design and construction
- Architects: Trowbridge & Livingston; Edward Mellon
- Developer: Andrew W. Mellon
- Structural engineer: McClintic-Marshall Construction Company
- Main contractor: Mellon-Stuart

Other information
- Public transit access: Steel Plaza

Website
- rrpittsburgh.com/properties/gulf-tower/

Pittsburgh Landmark – PHLF
- Designated: 1973

The Gulf Tower is a 44-story, 177.4 m (582 ft) Art Deco skyscraper in downtown Pittsburgh, Pennsylvania. The tower is one of the major distinctive and recognizable features of the city and is named for the Gulf Oil Corporation.

Built as the headquarters for the Gulf Oil Company, the structure was designed by the firm of Trowbridge & Livingston and completed in 1932 at a cost of $10.05 million ($193.7 million today). As late as 1981 Gulf Oil employed 3,100 within the building. Now called Gulf Tower, it has 44 floors and rises 177.4 m (582 ft) above downtown Pittsburgh. The crown of the skyscraper is modeled after the Mausoleum of Halicarnassus in the style of a step pyramid. The building was listed as a Pittsburgh History & Landmarks Foundation Historic Landmark in 1973.

On June 13, 1974, a bomb was detonated on the 29th floor of the Gulf Tower. The Weather Underground Organization took credit for the attack, claiming it was in protest to Gulf Oil's involvement in the oil rich regions affected by the Angolan War of Independence.

The building was condemned following a fire on May 19, 2021, and reopened after repairs six months later.

== Weather beacon ==
Prior to the late 1970s, the entire multistory "step-pyramid/mausoleum" structure at the top of the building was neon-illuminated, changing colors to provide a weather forecast that could be seen for many miles. This concept was developed by the building manager Edward H. Heath. He used the Gulf Oil colors to create a simplified forecast: steady blue meant colder and fair; flashing blue meant colder with precipitation; steady orange meant warmer and fair; flashing orange meant warmer with precipitation. Subsequently, in an effort to conserve energy, the weather forecasting role had been limited to the weather beacon at the pinnacle of the pyramid, which would glow blue for precipitation and red for fair weather. Although the terraced sides were once again illuminated at night (by means of spotlights), the entire pyramid structure no longer changed color with the weather (the pinnacle beacon still had that function).

Original Weather Beacon
Blue – steady	–	fair & colder temperature
Blue – flashing	–	precipitation & colder temperature
Orange red – steady	–	fair & rising temperature
Orange red – flashing	–	precipitation & rising temperature

Since the 2001 opening of PNC Park across the Allegheny River, after Pittsburgh Pirates home runs, the "beam" light flashes in celebration. Regina Taylor, a receptionist at the lobby desk who listens to games on the radio, is behind this. Pirates announcer Lanny Frattare, after he learned who was responsible, started saying, "Flash the beam, Regina – that one's out of here!" after a Pirates home run at home.

The KDKA Weather Beacon, the most recent weather beacon to adorn the pyramid atop the tower, was officially dedicated on July 4, 2012. In partnership with KDKA-TV, the Gulf Tower was retrofit with a modern, automated LED weather beacon able to tell a more complete forecast than ever before. It also features holiday displays. Hearkening back to the original 1950's beacon, the entire pyramid once again changes colors at night depending on the current weather conditions:

Floor By Floor Breakdown

- 44th floor – temperature
- 43rd floor – temperature
- 42nd floor – temperature
- 41st floor – precipitation
- 40th floor – humidity
- 39th floor – wind speed

Temperature
Dark blue	–	<0 °F (−18 °C)
Med blue	–	0 to 32 °F (−18 to 0 °C)
Light blue	–	33 to 49 °F (1 to 9 °C)
Amber	–	50 to 65 °F (10 to 18 °C)
Orange	–	66 to 79 °F (19 to 26 °C)
Red	–	>80 °F (27 °C)

Precipitation
Red purple	–	>.25 in (0.64 cm)
Blue purple	–	≤.25 in (0.64 cm)

Humidity
Light green	–	<50%
Dark green	–	≥50%

Wind Speed
Magenta	–	>10 mph (16 km/h)
Pink	–	≤10 mph (16 km/h)

== See also ==
- List of tallest buildings in Pittsburgh
- List of tallest buildings in Pennsylvania

Records
Preceded by Philadelphia City Hall	Tallest building Pennsylvania; 177 metres (581 ft); 1932–1970	Succeeded by U.S. Steel Tower
Preceded by Grant Building	Tallest building in Pittsburgh; 177 metres (581 ft); 1932–1970	Succeeded by U.S. Steel Tower

Preceded by Tower at PNC Plaza	Pittsburgh Skyscrapers by Height; 582 feet (177 m); 44 floors	Succeeded by Oxford Centre
Preceded by Grant Building	Pittsburgh Skyscrapers by Year of Completion; 1932	Succeeded by Cathedral of Learning
