= Emmet Building =

Building in Manhattan, New York

Coordinates: 40.7444°N 73.9851°W

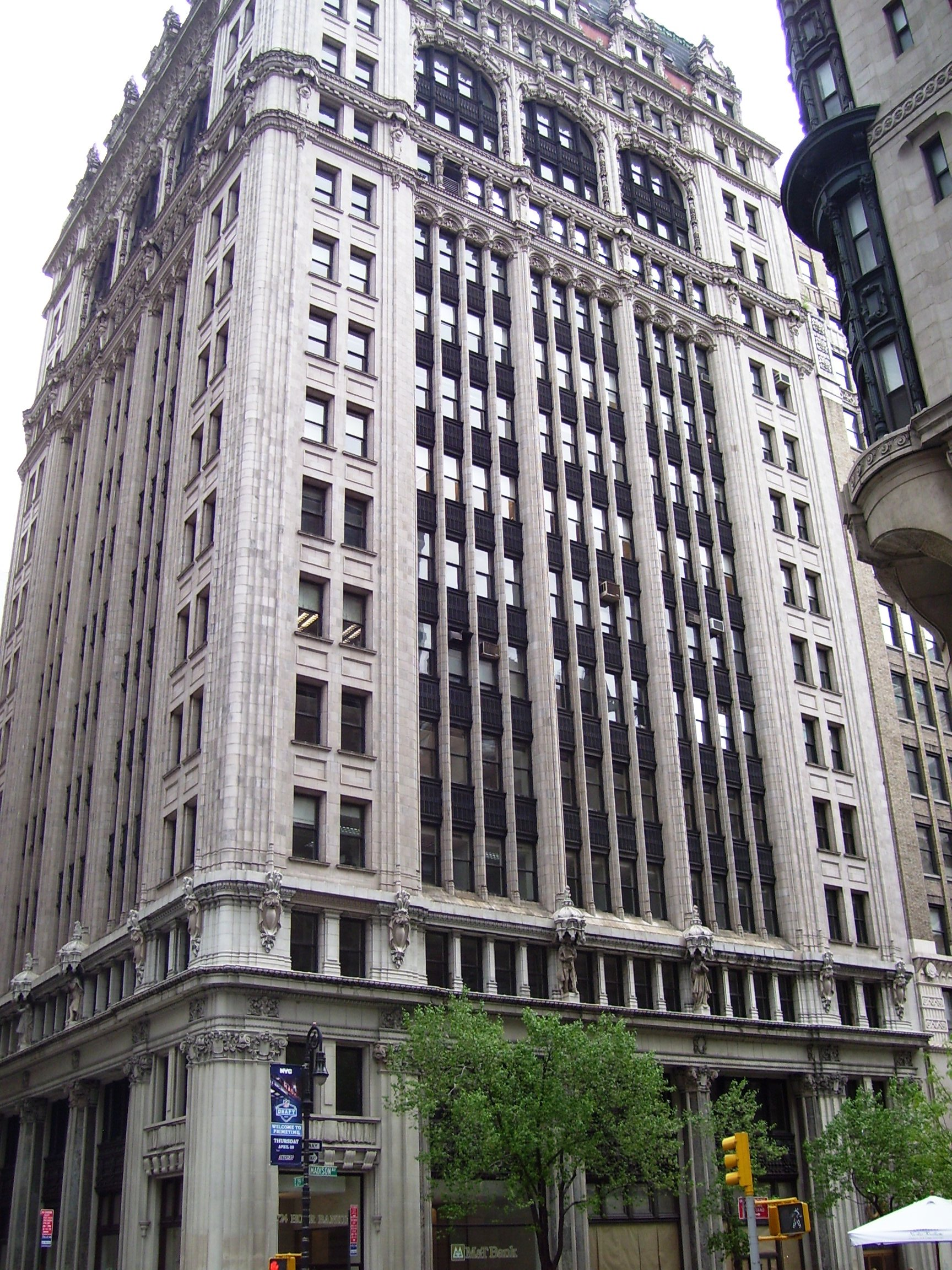
Emmet Building in 2011

The Emmet Building is a historic 16-story building located at 89–95 Madison Avenue at 29th Street, in the NoMad neighborhood of Manhattan, New York City. It was designed by John Stewart Barney and Stockton B. Colt of the architectural firm of Barney & Colt for Dr. Thomas Addis Emmet, a prominent gynecological surgeon who was also an author of books on Irish history. He was the son of Emmet John Patten (1796–1842), a chemistry professor at the University of Virginia who was born in Ireland and was the nephew of Robert Emmet, the advocate for Irish independence.

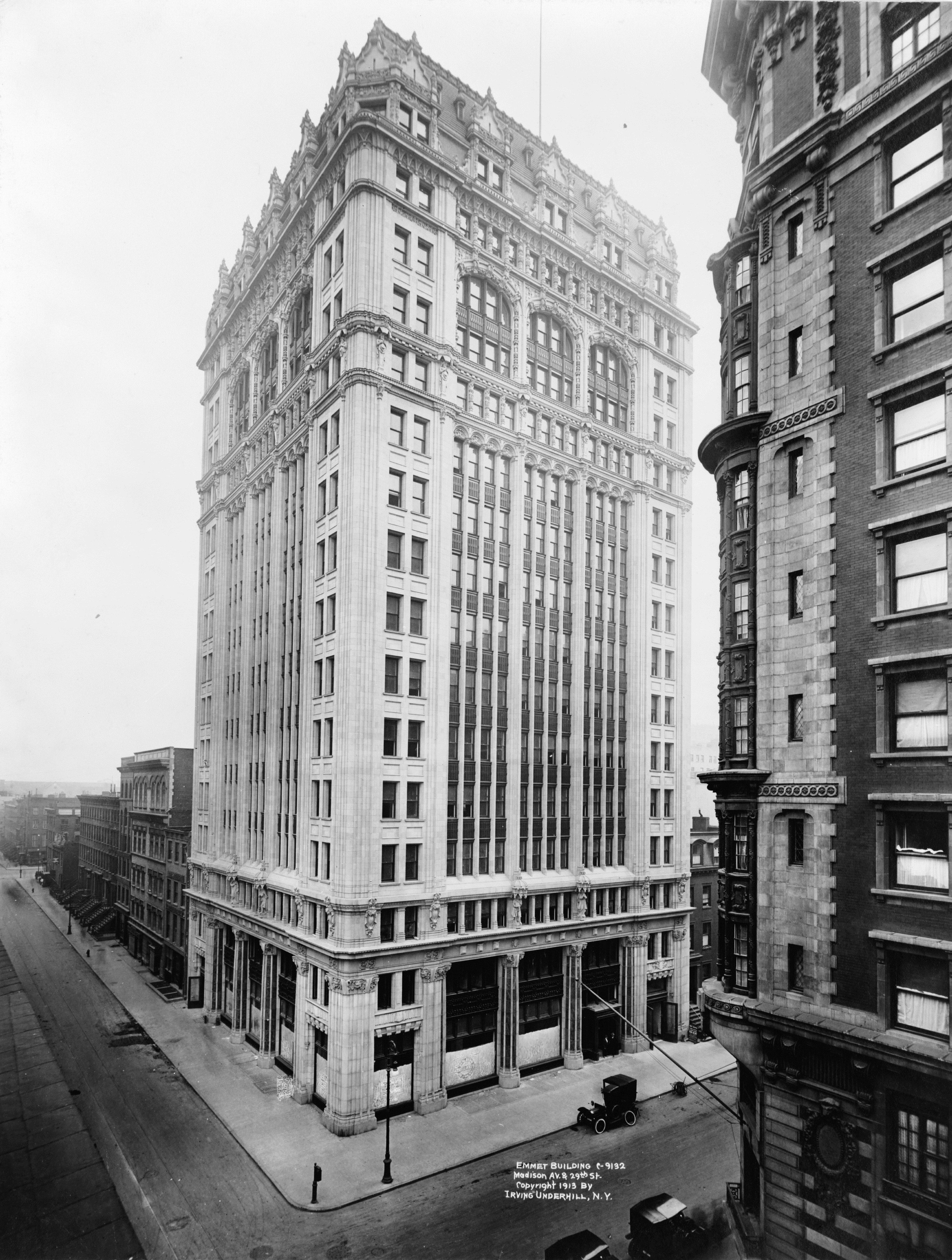
Emmet Building in 1913, photograph by Irving Underhill

The building was constructed between 1911 and 1912, replacing Emmet's own townhouse at 89 Madison, and four other properties at 91–95 Madison which he had acquired. Although the building's primary function was to serve commercial tenants in the area north of Madison Square Park, Emmet had a penthouse apartment that included custom designed furnishings by Keeble, Ltd. It was served by a private elevator. He moved in with his 51-year old son, his nurse, and his cook, Koricki Myamiata, and lived in the building for more than 40 years. Commercial space was located on the lower floors of the building; early tenants included wholesale silk merchants William Openhym & Sons and the Manhattan Shirt Company.

== Architecture ==
The neo-Renaissance building building is adorned in terracotta Gothic Revival ornamentation. The exterior of the first two floors used limestone and were adorned with cast-iron ornamentation and green marble-clad pillars. The lower story exterior features Medieval figures, canopies, and gargoyles, as well as "cavaliers and courtesans". Exterior columns span between the fourth and eleventh floors. The lobby was adorned with Sienna and Numida marble, mosaic floors, and bronze elevator doors and surround. The facade underwent restoration in 1991.

The fifth edition of the AIA Guide to New York City speculates that the design of the building may have been inspired by the Woolworth Building.

== Landmarking ==
The Emmet Building, as well as the Hotel Seville NoMad across the street, were designated as landmarks by the New York City Landmarks Preservation Commission on March 6, 2018. Landmarks Preservation Commission chairperson Meenakshi Srinivasan said, "These elegant buildings are not only distinctive and exemplary on their own, but together they represent an era of change and development in the area north of Madison Square during the early 20th century." The family that owns it has been renovating the building, and, after initially supporting the landmarking, later expressed displeasure with how the Landmark Preservation Commission operates and its bureaucracy. By 2026, the building was being converted to residential use.
