= Nathaniel L. McCready House =

Mansion in Manhattan, New York

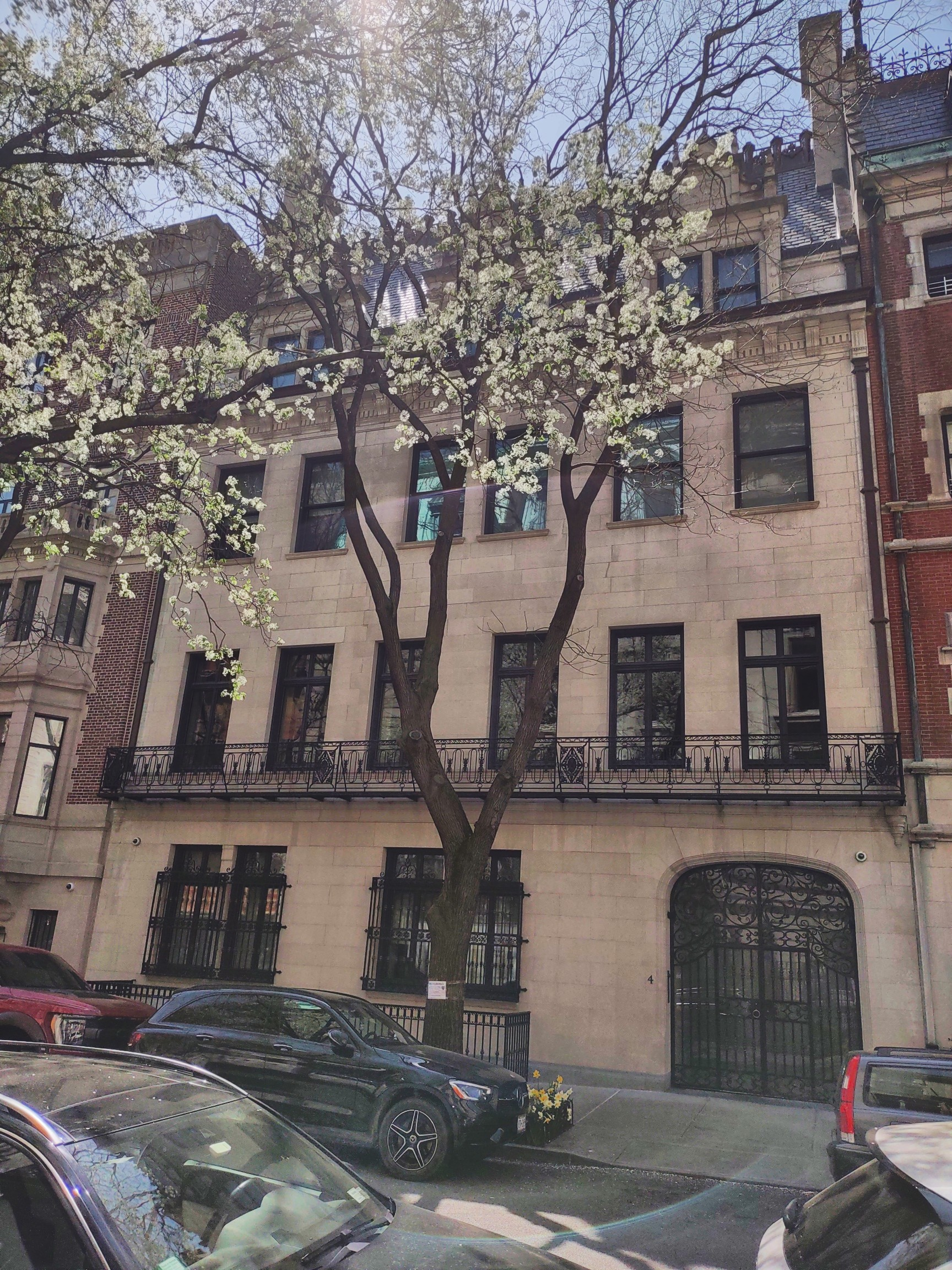
- Nathaniel L. McCready House 2022
- Interactive map of the Nathaniel L. McCready House area
- Alternative names: Harkness Mansion

General information
- Type: House
- Architectural style: French Renaissance
- Location: 4 East 75th Street, Manhattan, New York, United States
- Coordinates: 40.77422842964514°N 73.9650485795869°W
- Construction started: 1895
- Completed: January 1896
- Owner: Larry Gagosian

Dimensions
- Diameter: 50 ft (15 m)

Technical details
- Material: limestone
- Floor count: 4
- Floor area: 20,000 sq ft (1,900 m^{2})

Design and construction
- Architecture firm: Trowbridge, Colt & Livingston

The Nathaniel L. McCready House, also known as the Harkness Mansion, is a mansion at 4 East 75th Street on the Upper East Side of Manhattan in New York City. Completed in 1896 for Nathaniel L'Hommediue McCready Jr., during the twentieth century it was occupied by Thomas J. Watson, Rebekah Harkness, whose name became associated with the building when she used it as the offices of the Harkness Ballet. In 2011, the home was purchased by Larry Gagosian, who demolished the mansion's interior.

== Construction ==
The mansion was built for Nathaniel L'Hommediue McCready Jr., a stockbroker, and his wife, Jeanne Borrowe McCready. The McCreadies purchased two plots on 75th Street in 1894, and commissioned Trowbridge, Colt & Livingston to design a 50-foot (15 m)-wide French Renaissance-inspired mansion. The building was completed in January 1896 with interior floor space of 20,000 square feet (1,900 m^{2}). The building's limestone facade a second-story iron balcony are characteristic of many houses constructed on the same block in following decades.

== Ownership ==
The house was sold to V. Everit Macy and Edith Carpenter Macy in 1917, who converted it to a rest house for American combatants in World War I. After the war, the house passed to Stanley Mortimer and Elizabeth Livingston Hall. They redecorated the home with Stanley Mortimer's art collection.

In 1940, the house was sold to Thomas J. Watson, founder of IBM. During his residence there, Watson used the house to entertain heads of state from the United Kingdom, Greece, Brazil, and Uruguay. Watson died in 1956 and the home was sold to Eva Fox, widow of Hollywood producer William Fox.

The property became known as the Harkness Mansion when it was sold to Rebekah Harkness in 1964. Harkness' uncle-in-law, Edward S. Harkness, had established a mansion across the street about 50 years before. She used the home to host the Harkness Ballet and other cultural pursuits, but disbanded the ballet in 1975.

In 1987, the home was sold to Jean Doumanian, a film producer, who began renovating it in 2001. In 2006, the home was sold for $53 million to J. Christopher Flowers, a private equity broker, who began an interior renovation of the home. After the housing market crash, Flowers sold the property in 2011 for $36 million to Larry Gagosian. Gagosian, an art dealer, began a four-year gut renovation led by architect Annabelle Selldorf, demolishing the entire structure except for the limestone facade.
