= Reportage (disambiguation) =

Reportage sometimes refers to the total media coverage of a particular topic or event, including news reporting and analysis.

Reportage may also refer to:

- Reportage (album), an unfinished and unreleased album by the British band Duran Duran
- Reportage (TV show), a youth-oriented current affairs show in the BBC's late-80s/early-90s DEF II slot
- Neutral reportage, a common law defense against libel and defamation lawsuits usually involving media republishing unproven accusations about public figures
- Reportage Press, a publishing house
- Reportage 57, a 1959 East German film
