= Harte-Hanks Communications, Inc. v. Connaughton =

- Supreme Court of the United States

Argued March 20, 1989 Decided June 22, 1989
- Full case name: Harte-Hanks Communications, Incorporated v. Daniel Connaughton
- Citations: 491 U.S. 657 (more) 109 S. Ct. 2678; 105 L. Ed. 2d 562; 1989 U.S. LEXIS 3133

Case history
- Prior: Motion to dismiss denied, (S.D. Ohio.); judgment for plaintiff, S.D. Ohio.; judgment set aside, judgment for defendant (S.D. Ohio 1984); affirmed, 842 F.2d 825 (6th Cir. 1988); rehearing denied, 6th Circuit; cert. granted, 488 U.S. 907 (1988).

Holding
- Ignoring obvious sources and reporting with a reckless disregard for the truth are sufficient evidence for actual malice in libel law.

Court membership
- Chief Justice William Rehnquist Associate Justices William J. Brennan Jr. · Byron White; Thurgood Marshall · Harry Blackmun; John P. Stevens · Sandra Day O'Connor; Antonin Scalia · Anthony Kennedy

Case opinions
- Majority: Stevens, joined by Rehnquist, Brennan, White, Marshall, Blackmun, O'Connor, Kennedy
- Concurrence: White, joined by Rehnquist
- Concurrence: Blackmun
- Concurrence: Kennedy
- Concurrence: Scalia (in the judgment)

Laws applied
- U.S. Const. amend. I

Harte-Hanks Communications Inc. v. Connaughton, 491 U.S. 657 (1989), was a case in which the Supreme Court of the United States supplied an additional journalistic behavior that constitutes actual malice as first discussed in New York Times Co. v. Sullivan (1964). In the case, the Court held that departure from responsible reporting and unreasonable reporting conduct alone were not sufficient to award a public figure damages in a libel case. However, the Court also ruled that if reporters wrote with reckless disregard for the truth, which included ignoring obvious sources for their report, plaintiffs could be awarded compensatory damages on the grounds of actual malice.

== Background ==
In November 1983, Daniel Connaughton unsuccessfully ran for the position of Municipal Judge of Hamilton, Ohio, losing to incumbent James Dolan. A local newspaper, the Hamilton JournalNews, supported the incumbent Dolan. About a month before the election, Dolan's Director of Court Services resigned his position and was subsequently arrested on perjury charges. On November 1, 1983, while a grand jury investigation of the charges was taking place, the JournalNews ran a front page article quoting Alice Thompson, a witness in the trial. Thompson was quoted as saying Connaughton had used "dirty tricks" and had offered both Thompson and her sister tangible benefits (including employment opportunities and a trip to Florida) "in appreciation" for Thompson's testimony in the trial.

=== Lower court proceedings ===
Connaughton filed suit against Harte-Hanks Communications, the publisher of the JournalNews, alleging that its article had defamed him. He claimed the article was false, had injured his personal and professional and political reputation and was published on the grounds of actual malice. Harte-Hanks pushed for summary judgment, arguing that even if Thompson's statements were false, the article was protected under the neutral reportage privilege. The District Court denied their motion, saying it could not be proven the article was written with disinterest.

The case moved to trial, in which jurors listened to three separate interviews—two by JournalNews reporters and a third by Connaughton. The jury found that the reporting fulfilled three special verdicts for public figure libel: the article was defamatory, the article was false and the article was published with actual malice. The court awarded Connaughton $5,000 in compensatory damages and also $195,000 in punitive damages.

Harte-Hanks appealed, again citing the First Amendment defense against libel. The Sixth Circuit affirmed the lower court's decision however, writing that the court's ruling did not encroach upon the First Amendment rights of the publisher, and that the lower court was not incorrect in labeling the article as defamatory and false.

== Opinion of the Court ==
The Supreme Court decided the case unanimously in favor of Connaughton. Justice Stevens delivered the opinion of the Court, joined by all members of the Court except Justice Scalia, who wrote an opinion concurring in the judgment. Separate concurring opinions were written by Justices White, Blackmun and Kennedy.

Justice Stevens began his opinion by referencing New York Times Co. v. Sullivan (1964) and Curtis Publishing Co. v. Butts (1967), which state that public figures, such as Connaughton, must definitively prove actual malice to be awarded damages in libel suits.

He then referenced the case Hustler Magazine v. Falwell (1988), which had occurred the year before, and had ruled that public figures "may not recover for the tort of intentional infliction of emotional distress . . . without showing . . . that the publication contains a false statement of fact which was made . . . with knowledge that the statement was false or with reckless disregard as to whether or not it was true."

However, citing St. Amant v. Thompson (1968), Stevens ruled that the reporters had acted with "reckless disregard for the truth." Stevens focused on Patsy Stephens, the elder sister of Alice Thompson. Stephens had been present when Connaughton had allegedly played "dirty" tricks with the sisters, and Thompson reported that Stephens could confirm the accusations against Connaughton. The editor of the JournalNews then instructed his employees to interview every witness to Connaughton and Thompson's conversation—except Patsy Stephens. Every other witness to the exchange denied Stephens' accusations. Justice Stevens wrote that a responsible newspaper would and should corroborate with obvious sources, particularly since Thompson had earlier assured that Stephens could confirm her charges, and Stephens would be the only witness to do so. Justice Stevens also wrote that "if the Journal News had serious doubts concerning the truth of Thompson's remarks, but was committed to running the story, there was good reason not to interview Stephens."

Additionally, Justice Stevens noted that Jim Blount, editorial director for the JournalNews, had penned an editorial on October 30, two days before the article in question surfaced. This editorial predicted that more information concerning the impropriety and integrity of the candidates might surface in the next few days. Stevens wrote that this can be taken to be mean that the JournalNews had already decided to publish the article on October 30, well before it had verified its sources.

Justice Stevens then explains that while public figures can legally endure more defamation than private persons, they are not completely unprotected by the courts, provided they can prove the defendants acted with actual malice.

He finished his opinion by stating that, because of the inconsistencies with the JournalNews' reporting, and because they deliberately ignored sources that would have either affirmed or denied Stephens' allegations, the JournalNews was guilty of reckless disregard for the truth and, by extension, actual malice.

== Aftermath ==
After the case was remanded to the lower court, Connaughton won the retrial, and the Supreme Court affirmed the decision by the Sixth Circuit.
