= Public Citizen v. Department of Justice =

- Supreme Court of the United States

Argued April 17, 1989 Decided June 21, 1989
- Full case name: Public Citizen v. United States Department of Justice, et al.
- Citations: 491 U.S. 440 (more) 109 S. Ct. 2558; 105 L. Ed. 2d 377; 1989 U.S. LEXIS 3119

Case history
- Prior: United States Court of Appeals for the District of Columbia Circuit found that the American Bar Association committee was “advisory committee” within meaning of Federal Advisory Committee Act, but that application of open meeting and records provisions of that Act to committee would be unconstitutional, Washington Legal Found. v. U.S. Dep't of Justice, 691 F. Supp. 483 (D.D.C. 1988); probable jurisdiction noted, 488 U.S. 979 (1988).

Holding
- Interest groups seeking to uphold the Federal Advisory Committee Act had standing to bring suit, and the Act did not apply to Justice Department's solicitation of committee's views on prospective judicial nominees.

Court membership
- Chief Justice William Rehnquist Associate Justices William J. Brennan Jr. · Byron White; Thurgood Marshall · Harry Blackmun; John P. Stevens · Sandra Day O'Connor; Antonin Scalia · Anthony Kennedy

Case opinions
- Majority: Brennan, joined by White, Marshall, Blackmun, Stevens
- Concurrence: Kennedy, joined by Rehnquist, O'Connor
- Scalia took no part in the consideration or decision of the case.

Laws applied
- U.S. Const. Art. II § 1, Federal Advisory Committee Act

Public Citizen v. Department of Justice, 491 U.S. 440 (1989), is a United States Supreme Court case in which the Court interpreted the Federal Advisory Committee Act as well as Article II of the United States Constitution.

== Background ==
The United States Department of Justice regularly seeks advice from the Standing Committee on Federal Judiciary of the American Bar Association (ABA) regarding potential nominees for judgeships. The ABA Committee's investigations, reports, and votes on potential nominees are kept confidential, although its rating of a particular candidate is made public if they are in fact nominated. Appellant Washington Legal Foundation (WLF) filed suit against the Justice Department after the ABA Committee refused WLF's request for the names of potential nominees it was considering and for its reports and minutes of its meetings.

The action was brought under the Federal Advisory Committee Act (FACA), which, among other things, defines an "advisory committee" as any group "established or utilized" by the President or an agency to give advice on public questions, and requires a covered group to file a charter, afford notice of its meetings, open those meetings to the public, and make its minutes, records, and reports available to the public.

The plaintiffs asked the District Court to declare the Committee an "advisory group" subject to FACA's requirements and to enjoin the Department from utilizing the ABA Committee until it complied with those requirements. The District Court dismissed, holding that the Department's use of the ABA Committee is subject to FACA's strictures, but that “FACA cannot constitutionally be applied to the ABA Committee because to do so would violate the express separation of nomination and consent powers set forth in Article II of the Constitution and because no overriding congressional interest in applying FACA to the ABA Committee has been demonstrated.”

== Opinion of the Court ==
Writing for the majority, Justice Brennan held that while a literal reading of FACA would cover the ABA, this literal reading could not have been what Congress intended, and that when such a literal reading would reach an odd result, the Court must look to other Congressional evidence.

Though Justice Brennan agreed that, literally speaking, the Executive "utilized" the ABA, he wrote that "'Utilize' is a woolly verb, its contours left undefined by the statute itself. Read unqualifiedly, it would extend FACA's requirements to any group of two or more persons, or at least any formal organization, from which the President or an Executive agency seeks advice."

Consulting the legislative history, he reasoned that the intent of FACA was to "cure specific ills, above all the wasteful expenditure of public funds for worthless committee meetings and biased proposals; although its reach is extensive, we cannot believe that it was intended to cover every formal and informal consultation between the President or an Executive agency and a group rendering advice." Justice Brennan concluded that "Weighing the deliberately inclusive statutory language against other evidence of congressional intent, it seems to us a close question whether FACA should be construed to apply to the ABA Committee, although on the whole we are fairly confident it should not."

In addition to the legislative history, Justice Brennan relied on the doctrine of Constitutional avoidance to favor an interpretation of FACA that would not reach the ABA.

== Kennedy's concurrence ==
In a separate concurrence, Justice Kennedy criticized Brennan's use of legislative history, saying that "[t]here is a ready starting point, which ought to serve also as a sufficient stopping point, for this kind of analysis: the plain language of the statute." And the Executive branch clearly "utilizes" the ABA, according to the ordinary meaning of the word.

Though agreeing, in principle, with the possibility of using the absurdity doctrine to change the meaning of a statute, Justice Kennedy said that the Court must act with "self-discipline" in invoking it, limiting its application to situations where "the result of applying the plain language would be, in a genuine sense, absurd, i.e., where it is quite impossible that Congress could have intended the result." He raised as an example a medieval law against drawing blood in the street, as applied against a doctor treating a sick man. Justice Kennedy also criticized the majority for citing the nearly one hundred year-old decision in Church of the Holy Trinity v. United States, 143 U.S. 457 (1892), utilizing similar reasoning, since in that case the outcome depended on the Court proclaiming the U.S. a "Christian Nation," and holding that Congress could not possibly have intended to restrict immigration of Christian ministers.

Despite this, Justice Kennedy concurred because he found that the application of FACA to the President's consultation of the ABA would violate the Appointments Clause of the Constitution. Agreeing with the District Court, he wrote that "the application of FACA would constitute a direct and real interference with the President's exclusive responsibility to nominate federal judges," and that Congress cannot interfere with the President's process for selecting judges.
