= Church of the Holy Trinity v. United States =

- Supreme Court of the United States

Submitted January 7, 1892 Argued January 7, 1892 Decided February 29, 1892
- Full case name: Church of the Holy Trinity v. United States
- Citations: 143 U.S. 457 (more) 12 S. Ct. 511; 36 L. Ed. 226; 1892 U.S. LEXIS 2036

Case history
- Prior: Error to the Circuit Court of the United States for the Southern District of New York

Holding
- The circuit court erred when it held that the contract hiring an English rector was within the prohibition of the statute, which disallowed a "person, company, partnership, or corporation, in any manner whatsoever to prepay the transportation, or in any way assist or encourage the importation or migration, of any alien or aliens, any foreigner or foreigners, into the United States ... under contract or agreement ... to perform labor or service of any kind in the United States".

Court membership
- Chief Justice Melville Fuller Associate Justices Stephen J. Field · John M. Harlan; Horace Gray · Samuel Blatchford; Lucius Q. C. Lamar II · David J. Brewer; Henry B. Brown

Case opinion
- Majority: Brewer, joined by unanimous

Laws applied
- U.S. chap. 164, 23 St. p. 332

Church of the Holy Trinity v. United States, 143 U.S. 457 (1892), was a U.S. Supreme Court case involving the Church of the Holy Trinity in New York and its employment contract with an English Anglican priest. The court held that the Alien Contract Labor Law of 1885 did not apply to the hiring of Christian ministers.

Although the statute’s text broadly prohibited contracts to import "labor or service of any kind", the court interpreted the law in light of what it viewed as Congress’s purpose. Justice David Josiah Brewer wrote that a thing may be "within the letter of the law" yet outside its intended scope, concluding that Congress did not intend to include Christian ministers within the prohibition on foreign contract labor.

The case became one of the Supreme Court's most frequently cited examples of the use of legislative intent to modify a statute's apparent plain meaning. It is also widely noted for Brewer’s dicta describing the United States as a "Christian nation", language that has drawn significant scholarly and judicial attention. Later justices, including Antonin Scalia and Anthony Kennedy, criticized the decision as a prominent illustration of non-textualist statutory interpretation.

== Background ==
In 1887, the Church of the Holy Trinity in New York entered into a contract to hire the Rev. E. Walpole Warren, an Anglican priest from England, to serve as its rector. To facilitate his travel to the United States, the church prepaid his passage and executed a written employment agreement.

At the time, the 1885 Alien Contract Labor Law prohibited "the importation and migration of foreigners and aliens under contract or agreement to perform labor or service of any kind in the United States, its territories, and the District of Columbia." Congress enacted the law to curb the recruitment of foreign laborers, particularly industrial and manual workers, by American employers seeking cheaper labor. The statute made it unlawful for any person or organization to assist or encourage such importation, with certain enumerated exceptions for professional categories such as actors, artists, and domestic servants.

Federal authorities charged the church with violating the statute on the theory that Warren, as a foreign national under contract to perform services, fell within the law’s prohibition.

== Supreme Court ruling ==
The court held that the priest was not a "laborer" within the meaning of the statute, even though he was a foreign national.

The court used the soft plain meaning rule to interpret the statute in this case. Justice David Josiah Brewer made a principle of statutory construction that "It is a familiar rule, that a thing may be within the letter of the statute and yet not within the statute, because not within its spirit, nor within the intention of its makers." Its decision stated that "the circuit court did err when it held that the contract hiring an English rector was within the prohibition of the statute, which disallowed a '... person, company, partnership, or corporation, in any manner whatsoever to prepay the transportation, or in any way assist or encourage the importation or migration, of any alien or aliens, any foreigner or foreigners, into the United States ... under contract or agreement ... to perform labor or service of any kind in the United States'".

The case is widely noted for Justice Brewer's statements describing the United States as a "Christian nation". Brewer wrote:

These, and many other matters which might be noticed, add a volume of unofficial declarations to the mass of organic utterances that this is a Christian nation. 143 U.S. 457 (1892)

== Analysis ==
The religious right in the United States has frequently invoked Church of the Holy Trinity v. United States to support claims that the United States was founded as a Christian nation and that government should reflect Christian principles. Brewer's statement that the United States was a "Christian nation" has been cited as support for Bible-based legislation and increased public spending for religious purposes. Brewer's later conduct and writings suggest, however, that his statement was not intended to establish Christianity as a source of American law. In L'Hote v. New Orleans (1900), Brewer declined to rely on the statement when rejecting a challenge to legalized prostitution based on its alleged incompatibility with Christianity. His 1905 book The United States: A Christian Nation likewise distinguished the country's Christian character from an established religion or religious requirements for public life, instead associating it with the prominence of Christianity among Americans and in American customs and traditions.

== Subsequent developments ==
The decision is frequently cited for its articulation of how courts may consider legislative intent when interpreting statutes. For example, in United Steelworkers of America v. Weber, 443 U.S. 193 (1979), in which the Supreme Court held that the prohibitions against racial discrimination in Title VII of the Civil Rights Act of 1964 did not bar all affirmative action programs by private employers which favored racial minorities, the Supreme Court quoted, as part of its analysis, Holy Trinity's principle of statutory interpretation that "[i]t is a 'familiar rule, that a thing may be within the letter of the statute and yet not within the statute, because not within its spirit, nor within the intention of its makers.'" Weber, 443 U.S. at 201, quoting Holy Trinity, 143 U.S. at 459. The Weber Court said that the language of Title VII "must therefore be read against the background of the legislative history of Title VII and the historical context from which the Act arose". Id.

Justice Antonin Scalia later criticized Holy Trinity as a leading example of courts privileging perceived legislative intent over statutory text, a practice he viewed as contrary to textualist principles. The textualist position holds that courts should follow the text of a law rather than attempt to read exceptions into the law in accordance with the legislative intent. Scalia described the case’s interpretive approach as "an invitation to judicial lawmaking."

In Public Citizen v. Department of Justice, 491 U.S. 440 (1989), Justice Anthony Kennedy, joined by Chief Justice William Rehnquist and Justice Sandra Day O'Connor, rejected reliance on Holy Trinity-style intent analysis, writing:

The central support for the Court's ultimate conclusion that Congress did not intend the law to cover Christian ministers is its lengthy review of the "unofficial declarations to the mass of organic utterances that this is a Christian nation", and which were taken to prove that it could not "be believed that a Congress of the United States intended to make it a misdemeanor for a church of this country to contract for the services of a Christian minister residing in another nation". I should think the potential of this doctrine to allow judges to substitute their personal predilections for the will of the Congress is so self-evident from the case which spawned it as to require no further discussion of its susceptibility to abuse.

== See also ==
- History of religion in the United States
- List of United States Supreme Court cases, volume 143
