= Barbed Wire Patent Case =

- Supreme Court of the United States

Decided February 29, 1892
- Full case name: Barbed Wire Patent Case
- Citations: 143 U.S. 275 (more)

Holding
- The invention secured for an improvement in wire fences involved invention, and the patent was valid. Courts incline to sustain a patent to the man who takes the final step in the invention which turns failure into success.

Court membership
- Chief Justice Melville Fuller Associate Justices Stephen J. Field · John M. Harlan; Horace Gray · Samuel Blatchford; Lucius Q. C. Lamar II · David J. Brewer; Henry B. Brown

The Barbed Wire Patent Case, 143 U.S. 275 was a significant patent dispute in 1892 between plaintiff Joseph Glidden and the USPTO regarding the right of barbed wire. Lucian Smith was the original inventor in 1867 and held patent rights for it, while Glidden made changes to the production of barbed wire, holding the barbs in place, in 1874 that he believed were novel enough to merit a new invention and thus new patent.

== Background ==
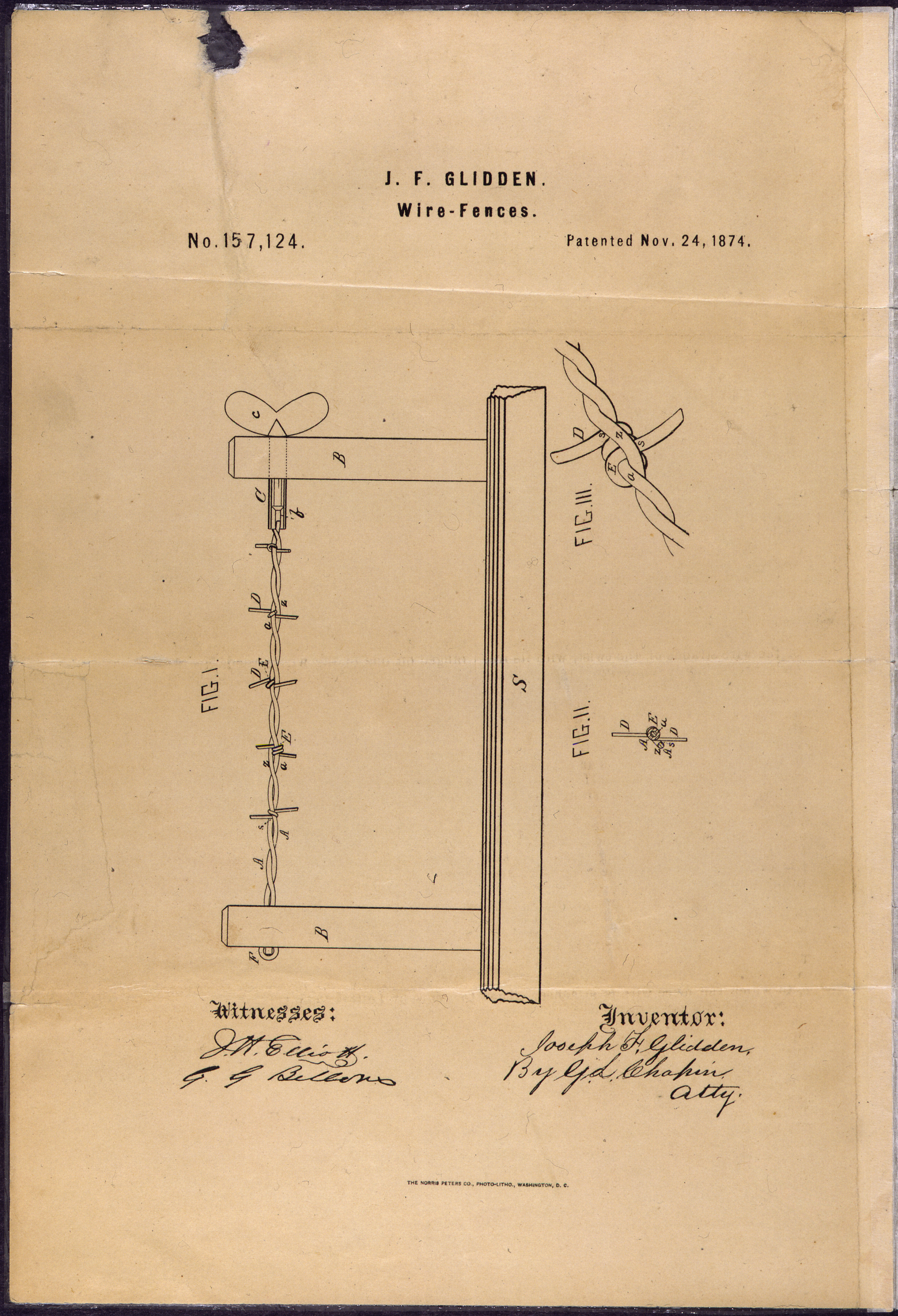
Patent drawing for Glidden's Improvement

Lucien B. Smith had first invented a basic form of barbed wire in 1867 and received the patent for it. Therefore, at the time he had exclusive rights to produce and sell his product. In 1874, after Glidden made his changes, he was issued a statement denying him a new patent on the grounds that his invention simply was not a novelty. His patent claim was for:

"a twisted fence wire having the transverse spur wire, D, bent at its middle portion about one of the wire strands, a, of said fence wire, and clamped in position and place by the other wire strand, z, twisted upon its fellow, substantially as specified."

The Patenting and Trademark office denied his application believing that the process was already widely known common knowledge and not novel enough to be distinguished from earlier patents.

After Glidden's patent application had been denied, he appealed to the decision and eventually the case went before the Supreme Court.

== Case ==
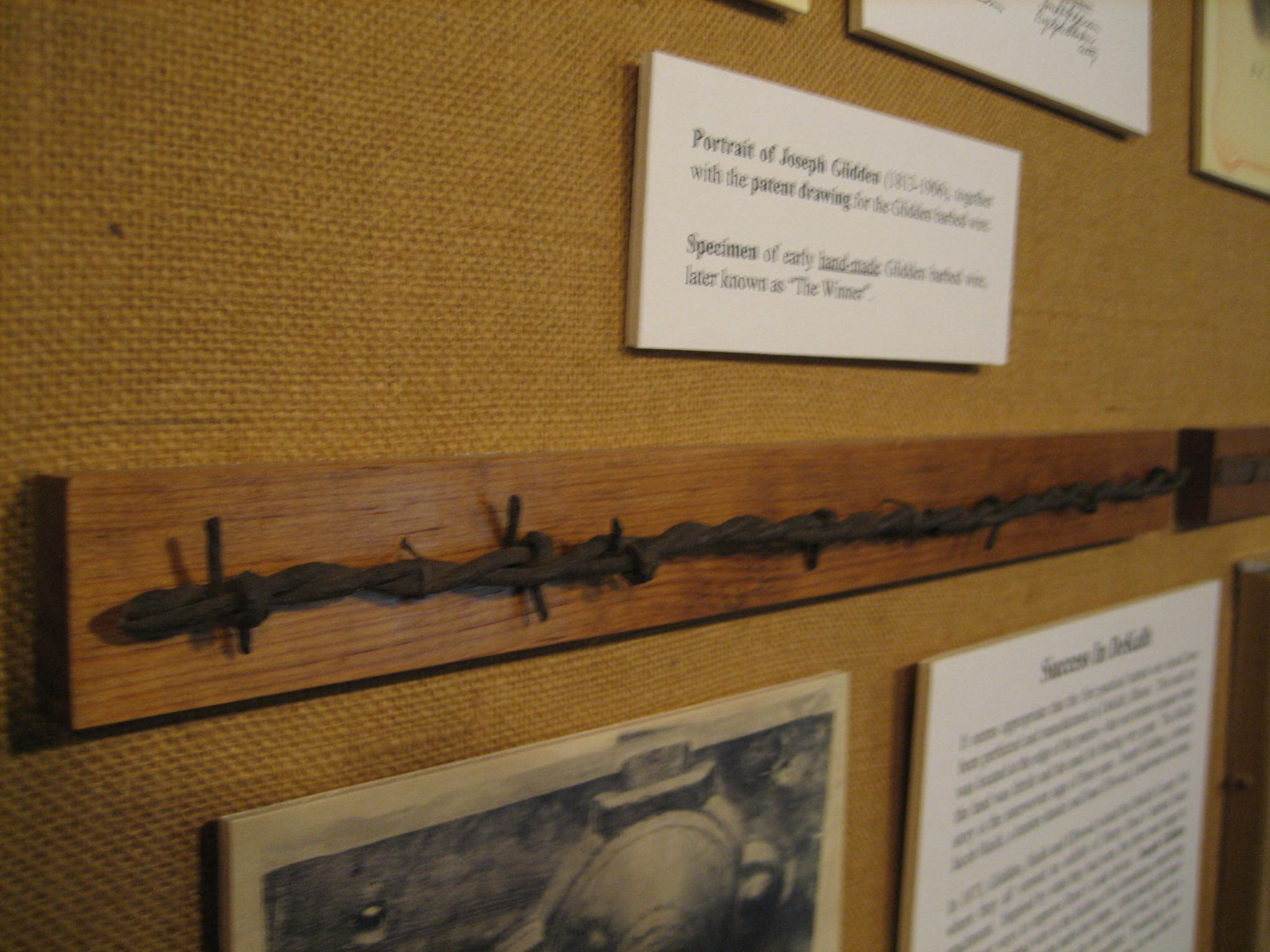
Early handmade specimen of Glidden's "The Winner" on display at the Barbed Wire History Museum in DeKalb, Illinois.

In the eyes of the court, the question of most importance was whether the invention of Glidden was sufficient in novelty. To answer this they considered for some length the process for producing barbed wire prior to this invention and compared it to Glidden's design. Glidden claimed that his process of adding an extra wire to stabilize the barbs without any other means made them sufficiently stronger and more efficient. However, he apparently did not make this clear until his initial patent application was denied and he had applied for reissue. Therefore, the court ignored this feature at first. Glidden stated:

"I do not claim to have originated the devices known as 'spurs' or 'prongs' on the wires, they having been used before, but confine myself to the means for holding the spurs at proper intervals on the wires and to the means for attaining a uniform tension of the wires, as claimed."

The court remarked that a new device phasing out an older version does not necessarily merit the awarding of a new patent, but it may merit consideration. The court took into account that Glidden's invention had widely replaced older versions and was now commonly in use.

The defense attempted to show that others had made the same design independently before Glidden, but the plaintiff was able to assert that indeed the other productions, which were of virtually similar design, were not made until after he issued his patent. The court agreed that there had been plenty of other attempts to create a similar design and product as Glidden, but none had been successful nor had they been successfully patented.

== Decision ==
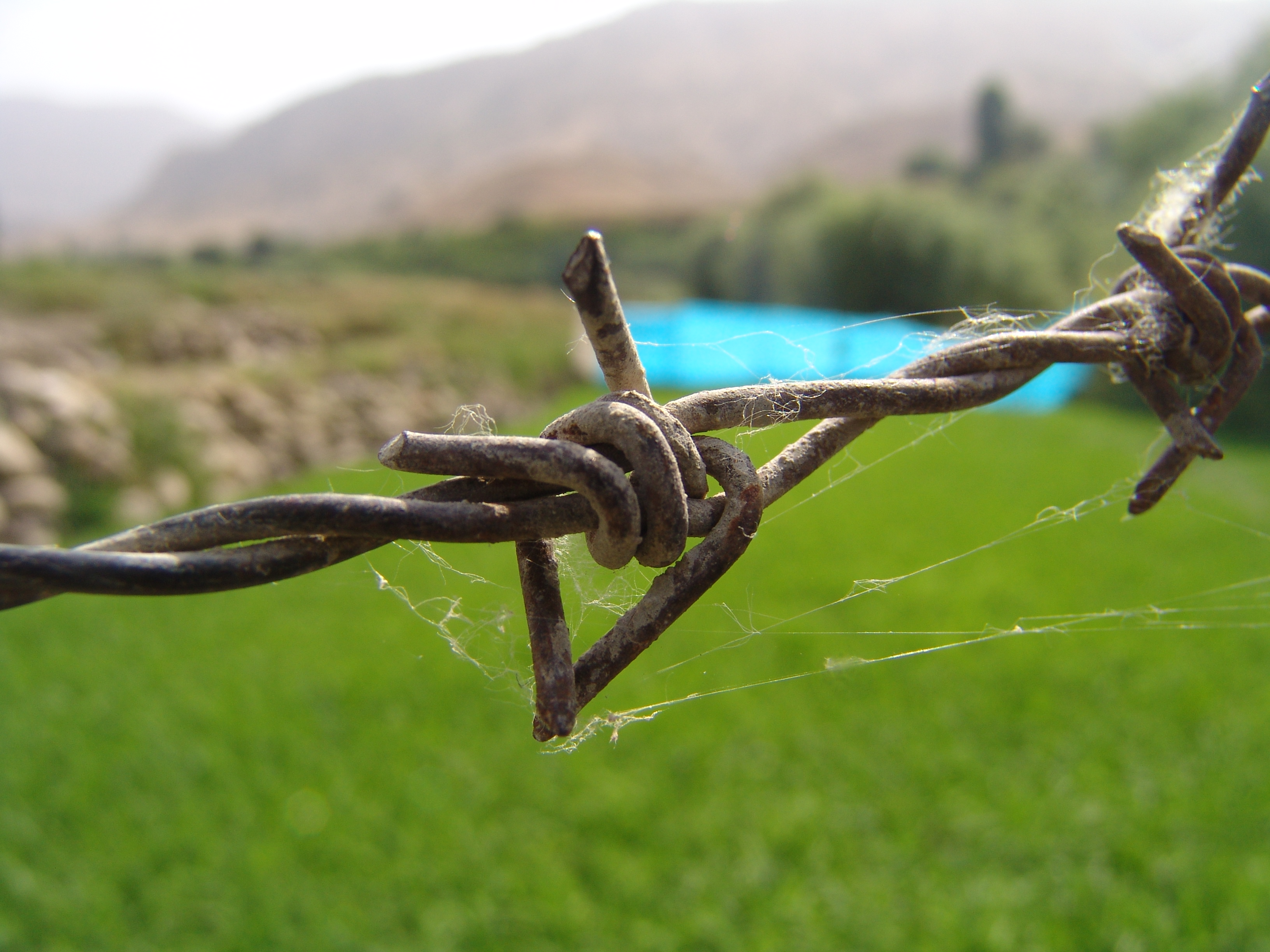
Close-up view of barbed wire

The circuit court finally decided to reverse the decision of the lower court and ruled in favor of the plaintiff, Joseph Glidden. The majority of the court was convinced that Glidden's invention proved to have enough novelty and technological change to merit the patent and thus exclusive rights to produce and sell the improved barbed wire without the need for licensing. Much of this decision came from the court's inclination to grant a patent to the final step in turning an invention into a useful or more useful product.

== Dissent ==
Justice Field was the sole dissenting opinion. He disagreed with the decision on the grounds that he believed there was no true novelty to Glidden's decision and thus lacked sufficient reasoning to receive a patent.

== Significance ==
This case largely established precedent for future patent law, specifically in questions of first-to-file, or scope of novelty. The first-to-file aspect was largely supported in that whichever party can prove they filed an invention first will have a greater claim over other manufacturers and better their chances of receiving a patent. Secondly, the scope of novelty was determined to not be some significant change, but simply enough to make a noticeable positive difference. Also success of a minor innovation is for grounds for patenting in light of the numerous failed or discontinued minor innovations pursued.

Glidden held sole rights to sell the product and thus established the Barb Fence Company, in Dekalb, Illinois. The invention made him extremely wealthy and by the time of his death he was one of the richest men in the United States.
