= Holy Trinity Episcopal Church (Manhattan) =

Church in Manhattan, New York

Coordinates: 40°45′11″N 73°58′44″W

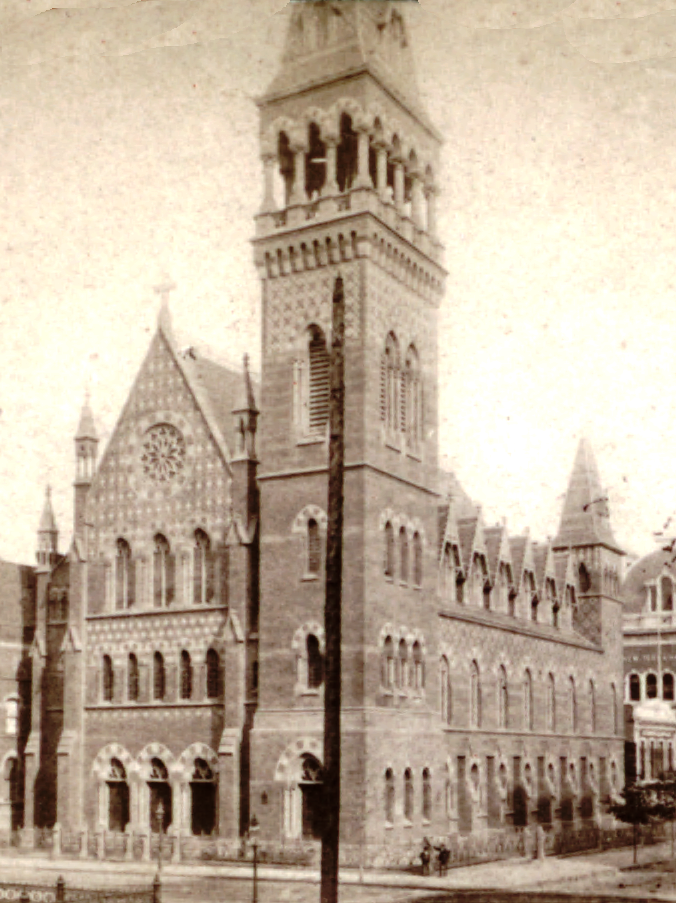
- A view of The Church of the Holy Trinity Episcopal Church at its first location prior to 1895 at Madison & 42nd Street from an early stereo card
- Interactive map of the Holy Trinity Episcopal Church area

General information
- Architectural style: Romanesque Revival architecture
- Location: Manhattan, New York City
- Opened: 1873
- Demolished: 1895

Design and construction
- Architect: Leopold Eidlitz

The Church of the Holy Trinity is an Episcopal parish church located at 316 East 88th Street between First and Second Avenues in the Yorkville neighborhood of Manhattan, New York City.

== History ==
The parish was originally located on the northeast corner of Madison Avenue and East 42nd Street in a Victorian cottage ornéé (ornamental cottage) designed by Jacob Wrey Mould. This building was replaced on the site in 1873 by one designed by Leopold Eidlitz in a High Victorian hybrid of the German Romanesque design. This was generally referred to as Dr. Tyng's Church after the "hardworking churchman, the younger Stephen H. Tyng, who organized it in 1874." The engagement by the parish of E. Walpole Warren as rector and pastor in September 1887 was the subject of the notable United States Supreme Court case Church of the Holy Trinity v. United States. The church building at its 42nd Street location was rather short-lived: in 1895, the parish merged with St. James', and the building was sold and demolished. Samuel Prowse Warren was organist at the church from 1874-1876.

The St. James parish had been given property by Serena Rhinelander on East 88th Street, on what was once the Rhinelander Farm. A mission church was built on this land from 1895 to 1899, designed by Barney and Chapman. It was consecrated on May 6, 1899. Although the mission was administered by St. James, it was called Holy Trinity. It became its own parish in 1951. The church complex includes St. Christopher House and a parsonage.

== See also ==
- Church of the Holy Trinity v. United States
