= Samuel Prowse Warren =

Canadian composer (1841–1915)

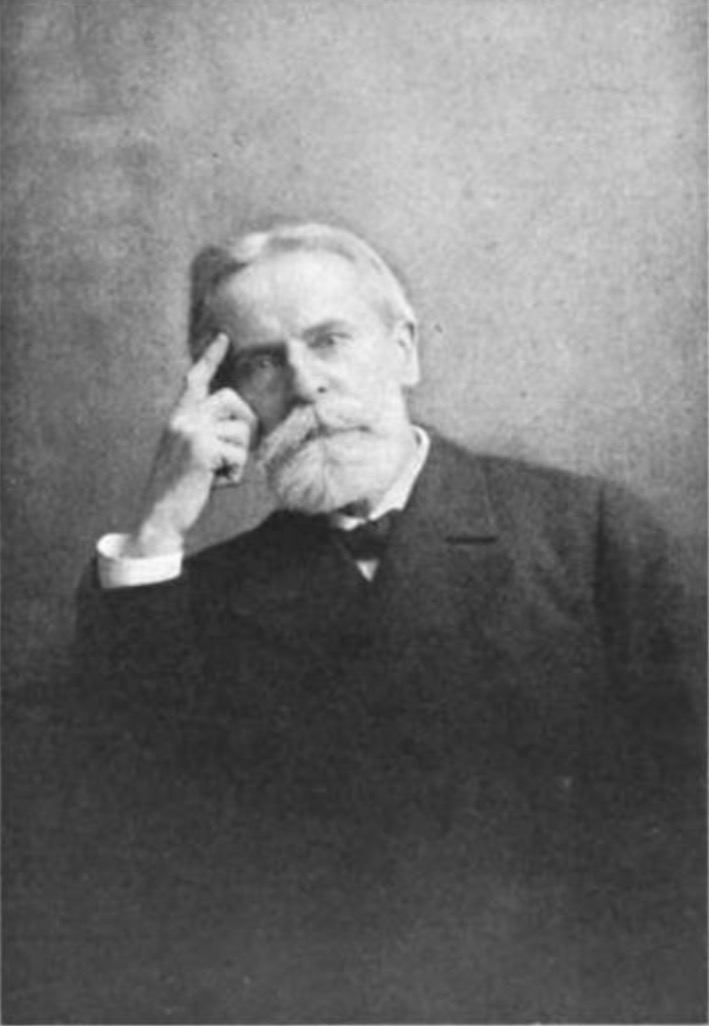

Background information
- Born: February 18, 1841; Montreal
- Died: October 7, 1915; New York City
- Occupation(s): Organist, composer, conductor, music editor, music educator

Samuel Prowse Warren (February 18, 1841 – October 7, 1915) was a Canadian organist, composer, conductor, music editor, and music educator. A founding member of the American Guild of Organists, he served as president of that organization in 1902. He worked as an organist in New York City for thirty years, holding posts as organist at the Unitarian Church of All Souls, Grace Church, and Holy Trinity Episcopal Church. At the time of his death he was organist at the First Presbyterian Church in East Orange, New Jersey.

== Life and career ==
Born in Montreal, Warren was initially trained as an organist by his father, the organist and organ builder Samuel Russell Warren (1809–1882). A child prodigy, he took over the duties of organist at the American Presbyterian Church in Montreal while still in his youth, serving in that capacity for eight years until 1858. In 1861–1864 he studied music in Berlin where he was a pupil of Carl August Haupt (organ), Gustav Schumann (piano), and Paul Wieprecht (music theory). In 1864 he returned to Montreal.

In 1865 Warren was appointed organist at the Unitarian Church of All Souls in New York City. He remained in that position until 1868 when he was appointed organist at Grace Church in Manhattan. He served as organist at Grace Church from 1868 to 1874, and again from 1876 to 1894, with the gap in his service there due to a stint as organist at the Holy Trinity Episcopal Church from 1874 to 1876. He ended his career as organist at the First Presbyterian Church in East Orange, New Jersey, where he served from 1895 until his death in 1915.

Though Warren was a prolific composer of anthems, songs, piano solos, and organ solos, most of his works were unpublished during his lifetime. However, following his death, a number of his works were published by G. Schirmer, Inc., an organization for which Warren had worked as a music editor for several years.

In addition to his work as an organist and music editor, Warren was also a respected teacher of the organ. One of his pupils, Augusta Maria Lowell (1857–1948), was one of the first women in North America to achieve success as an organist. Warren also worked as the conductor of the New York Vocal Union for nine years during his career. In 1896 he was a founding member of the American Guild of Organists, and served as president of that organization in 1902.

In 2001 Dover Publications republished The Practical Organist (French: Organiste pratique), a work originally published by G. Schirmer in 1889 that encompassed 50 liturgical works for organ by the composer Alexandre Guilmant, for which Warren was the music editor.

== Personal life and death ==
Warren married Emily A. Millard on January 16, 1867.

He died in New York City on October 7, 1915.
