= Grace Church (Manhattan) =

Episcopal church in Manhattan, New York

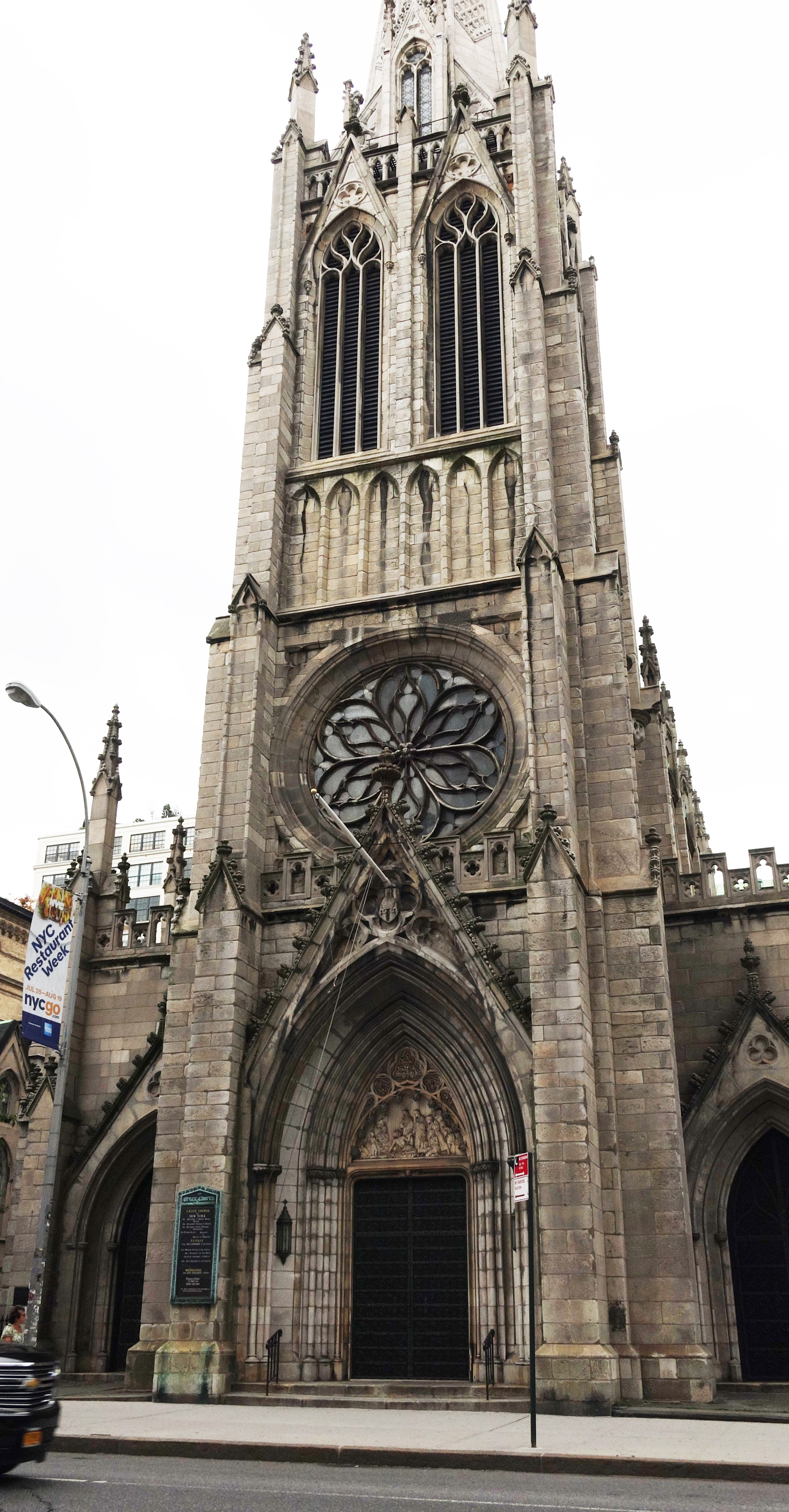

- Location within Lower Manhattan Location within New York City
- Location: 800–804 Broadway; Manhattan, New York City, New York
- Country: United States
- Denomination: Episcopal Church
- Churchmanship: Broad Church
- Website: gracechurchnyc.org

History
- Status: Parish church

Architecture
- Functional status: Active
- Years built: 1846–1847

Specifications
- Materials: Sing Sing marble exterior; lath and plaster interior

Administration
- Province: Province II
- Diocese: Episcopal Diocese of New York

Clergy
- Rector: The Rev. J. Donald Waring
- Grace Church and Dependencies
- U.S. National Register of Historic Places
- U.S. National Historic Landmark
- New York State Register of Historic Places
- New York City Landmark
- Location within Lower Manhattan
- Coordinates: 40°43′55.1″N 73°59′27.2″W
- Architect: James Renwick Jr. et al. (see below)
- Architectural style: Gothic Revival
- NRHP reference No.: 74001270
- NYSRHP No.: 06101.000063

Significant dates
- Added to NRHP: June 28, 1974
- Designated NHL: December 22, 1977
- Designated NYSRHP: June 23, 1980
- Designated NYCL: Church & rectory: March 15, 1966; Church houses: February 22, 1977

Grace Church is a historic parish church in Manhattan, New York City which is part of the Episcopal Diocese of New York. The church is located at 800–804 Broadway, at the corner of East 10th Street, where Broadway bends to the south-southwest, bringing it in alignment with the avenues in Manhattan's grid. Grace Church School and the church houses—which are now used by the school—are located to the east at 86–98 Fourth Avenue between East 10th and 12th Streets.

The church reported 903 members in 2015 and 1,083 members in 2025. Plate and pledge income reported for the congregation in 2025 was $1,469,194 with average Sunday attendance (ASA) of 406 persons.

The church, which has been called "one of the city's greatest treasures", is a French Gothic Revival masterpiece designed by James Renwick Jr., his first major commission. Grace Church is a National Historic Landmark designated for its architectural significance and place within the history of New York City, and the entire complex is a New York City landmark, designated in 1966 (church and rectory) and 1977 (church houses).

== History and architecture ==
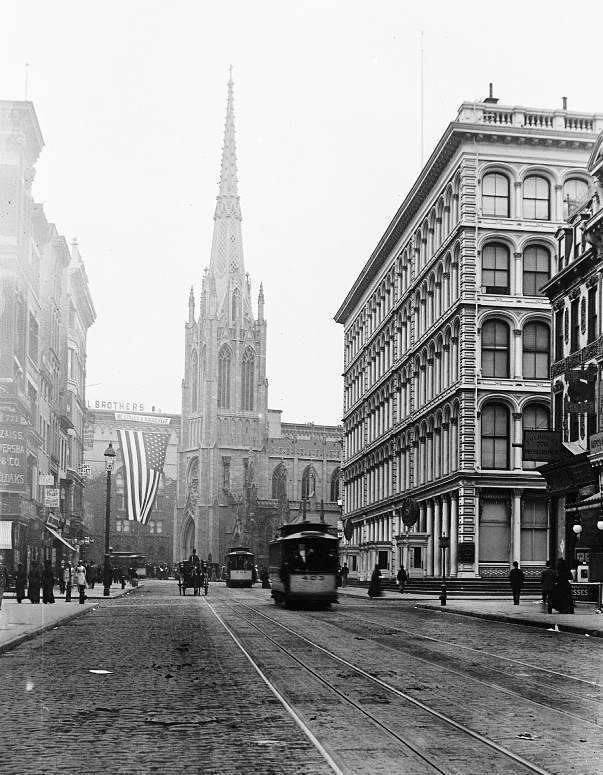
Grace Church, circa 1900

Grace Church was initially organized in 1808 at Broadway and Rector Street, on the current site of the Empire Building. Under rector Thomas House Taylor, who began service at the church in 1834, the decision was made to move the church uptown with the city's expanding population.

In 1843, the land on which the church was built was purchased from Henry Brevoort. The 25-year-old architect James Renwick Jr.—a nephew of Brevoort, whose sole completed work at the time was the Bowling Green Fountain—was commissioned as the architect. The cornerstone for the new church was laid in 1843 and the church was consecrated in 1846. Grace Church was designed in the French Gothic Revival style out of Sing Sing marble, and vestry minutes from January of that year break down some of the expenses for building a new church—including items ranging from the cost of the workers from Sing Sing state prison who cut the stone to the cost of the embroidery for the altar cloth. The church originally had a wooden spire, but under the leadership of the rector at the time, Henry Codman Potter, it was replaced in 1881 with a marble spire designed by Renwick. The interior of the church is primarily constructed from lath and plaster.

The east window over the high altar created by the English stained glass manufacturer Clayton and Bell in 1878, dominates the chancel, and the whole church; a "Te Deum" window, its theme is praise. The figures with their faces raised toward Christ, who is seated at the top center, represent prophets, apostles, martyrs and all the world. Other windows in the church are by Henry Holiday. The reredos, with mosaic figures of the evangelists, is made of French and Italian Marble and Caen stone, and shows the four Gospel writers, Matthew, Mark, Luke and John, flanking the Risen Christ as he gives the Great Commission, "Go into all the world and make disciples ..." This piece, along with the altar, was designed by Renwick and executed by Ellin & Kitson in 1878. The choir furniture was installed in 1903 after the chancel was lengthened an additional fifteen feet in a renovation designed by Heins and La Farge. On the lawn in front of Renwick's Grace House (1880–1881), which connects the sanctuary to his Rectory (1846–1847), stands a terra-cotta Roman urn dating from around the time of the Emperor Nero.

For a full generation after it was built it was the most fashionable church in New York: "For many years Grace has been the centre of fashionable New York", Matthew Hale Smith observed in 1869: "To be married or buried within its walls has been ever considered the height of felicity".

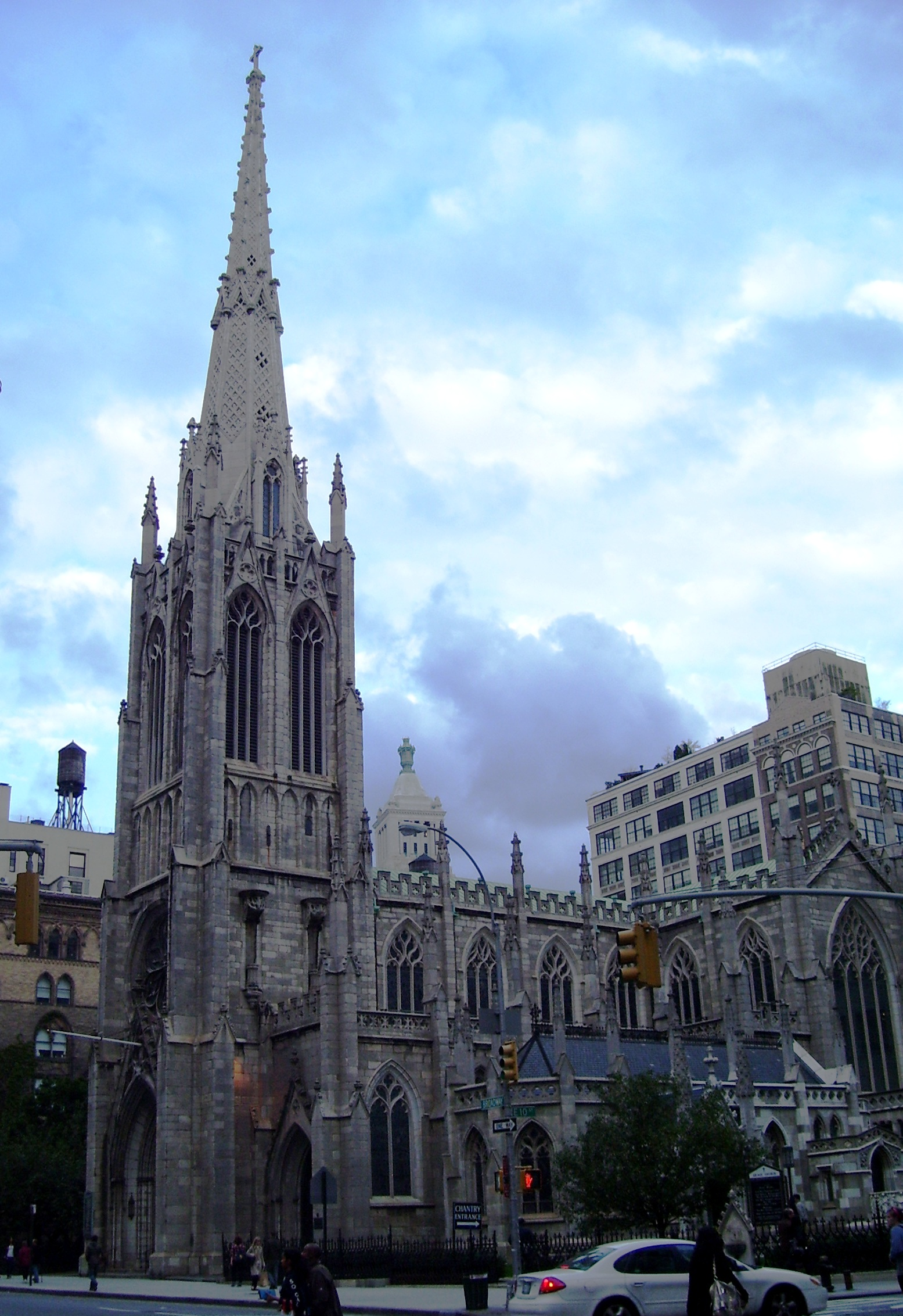
The Church at dusk

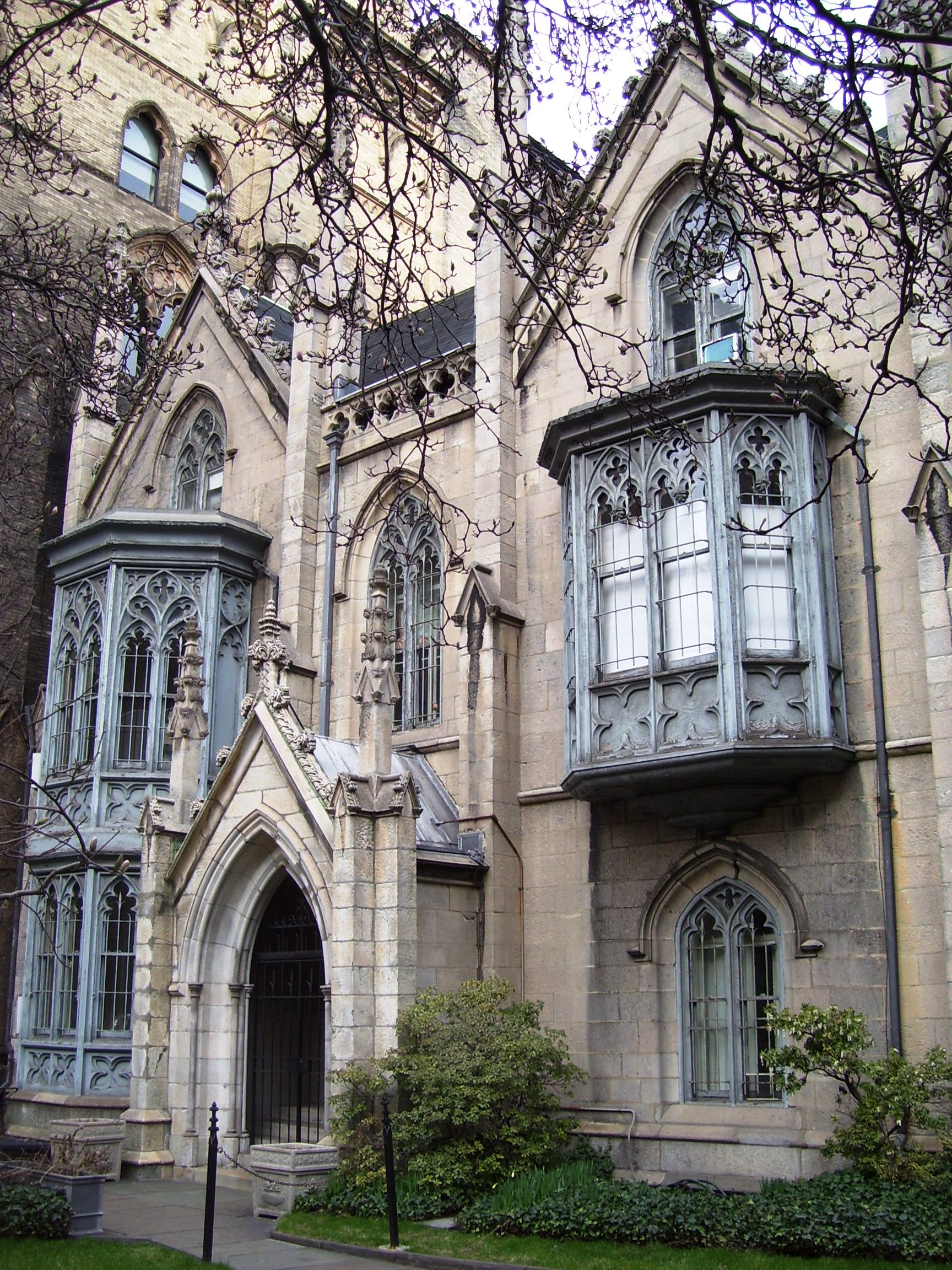
Renwick's 1847 rectory

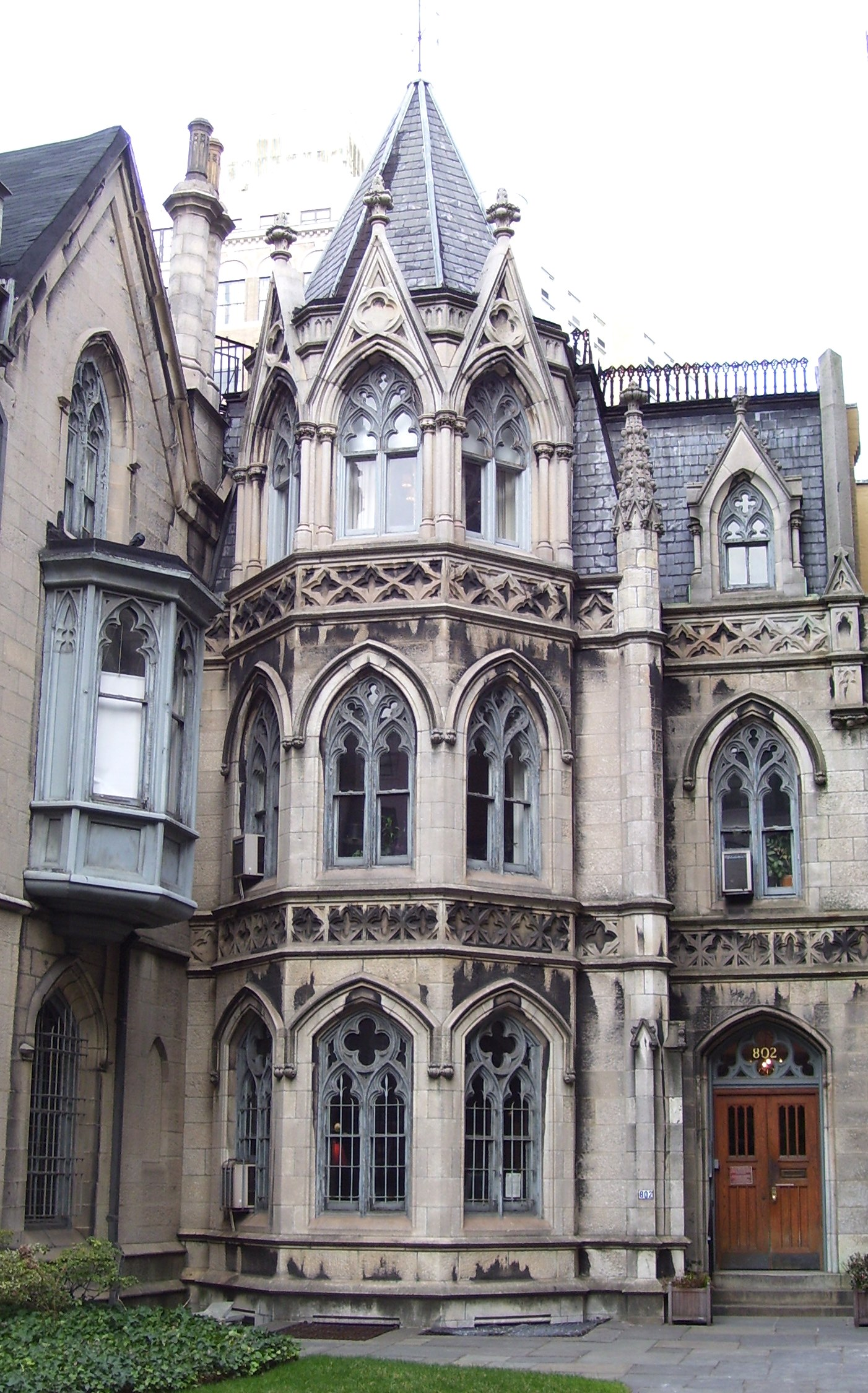
Grace House, also by Renwick (1881)

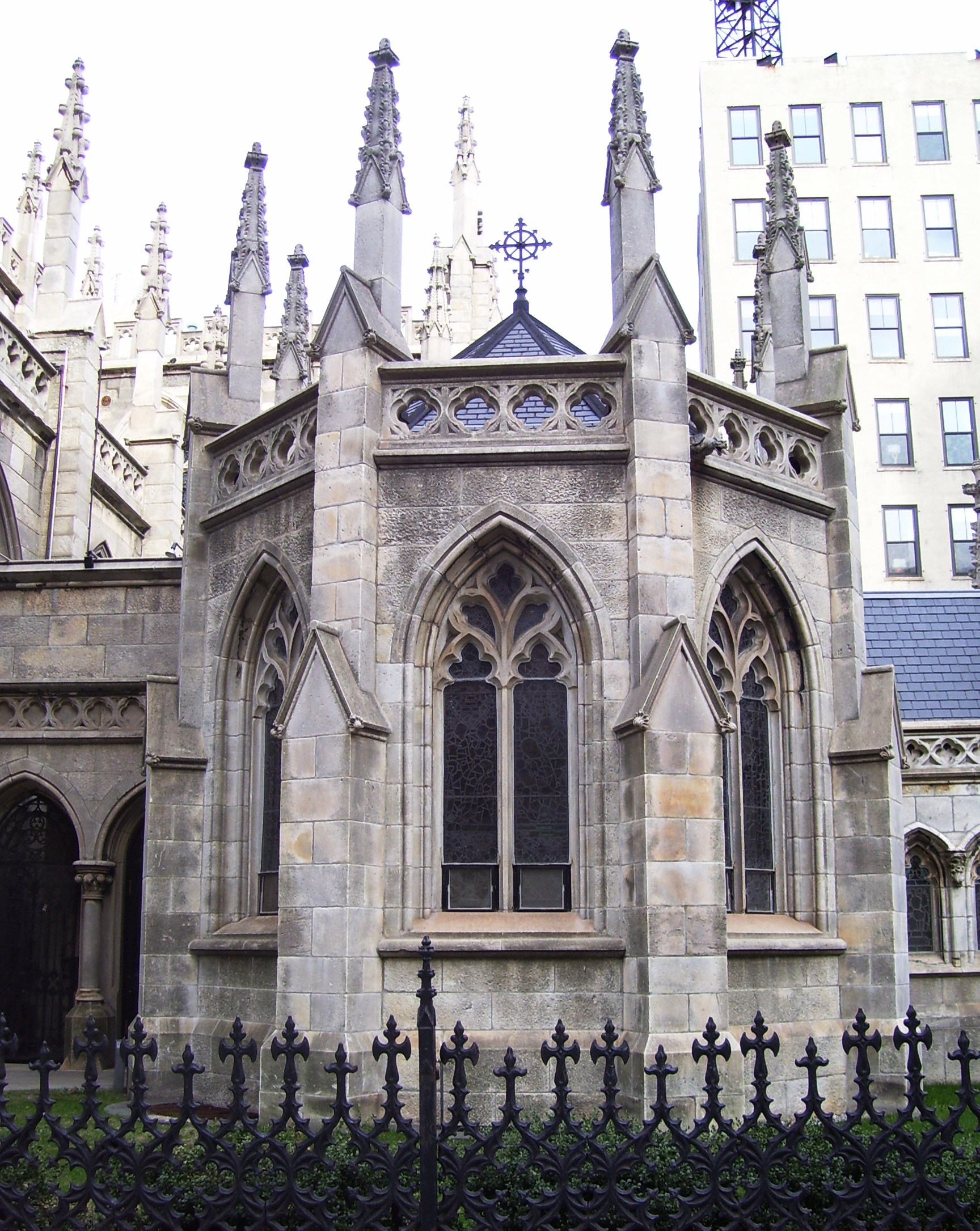
Edward T. Potter's chantry was built in 1879, and added to in 1910 by William W. Renwick; this is the view from Broadway

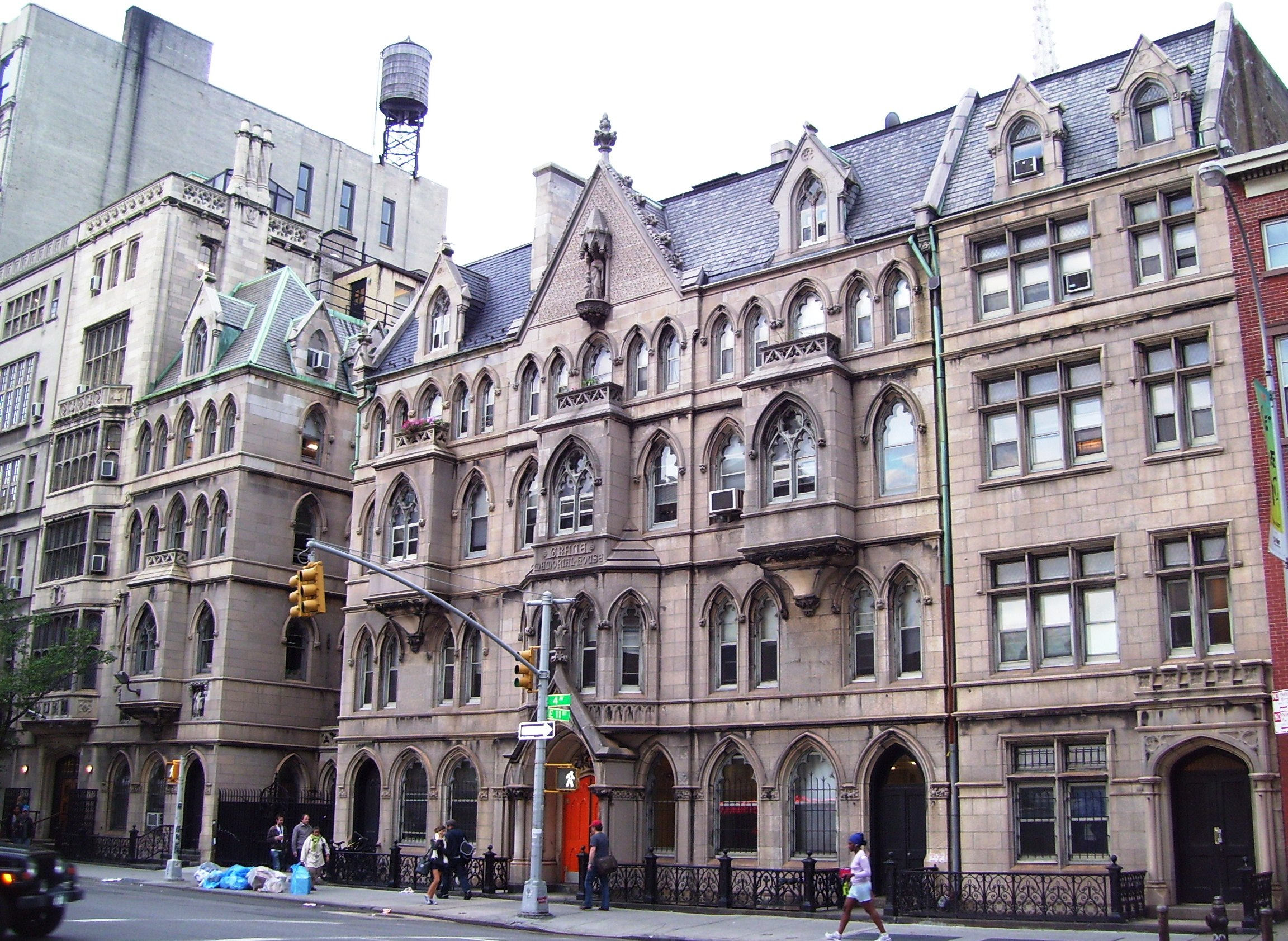
The church houses on Fourth Avenue, behind the church: Renwick's Memorial House takes up the three bays in the center, with Clergy House by Heins & LaFarge to its left, and Neighborhood House to its right.

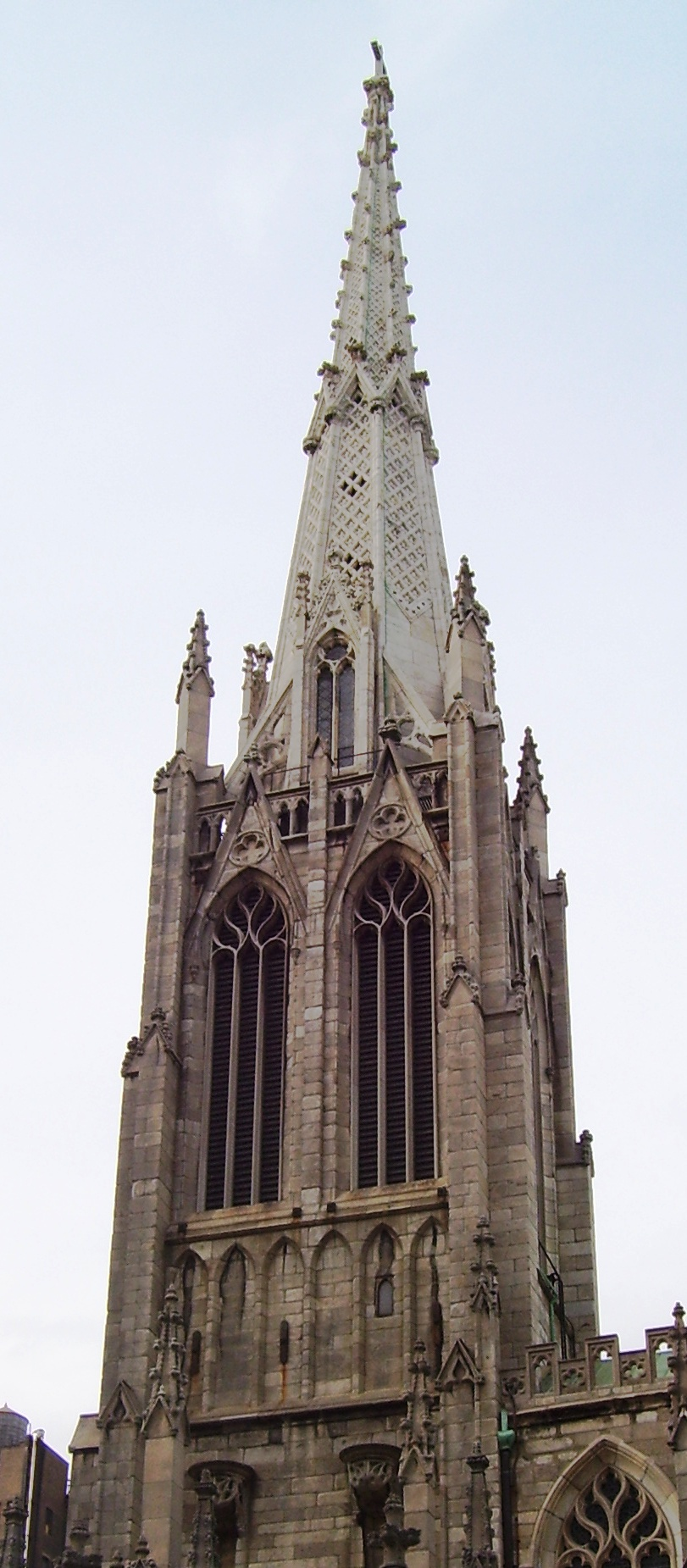
The marble steeple was installed in 1883, and had its lean fixed in 2003.

Date	Building or action	Architect
1843–1846	sanctuary (800 Broadway)	James Renwick Jr.
1846–1847	rectory (804 Broadway)	James Renwick Jr.
1878–1879	chantry	Edward T. Potter
1880–1881	Grace House (802 Broadway)	James Renwick Jr.
1881	front garden	Vaux & Co.
1881–1882	Memorial House (92–96 Fourth Avenue)	James Renwick Jr.
1883	replacement of wooden spire with marble spire	James Renwick Jr.
1902–1903	Clergy House (90 Fourth Avenue)	Heins & LaFarge
1903	extension of chancel	Heins & LaFarge
1906–1907	Neighborhood House (98 Fourth Avenue)	Renwick, Aspinwall & Tucker
1910	additions to chantry	William W. Renwick
1975–1976	addition to rear of church houses for school	
2003	straighten lean in spire	Walter B. Melvin Architects

=== Chapels ===
Like Trinity and the First Presbyterian Church, Grace Church spun off new congregations by building chapels elsewhere in the city. Its first chapel was on Madison Avenue at East 28th Street, built in 1850. The congregation became the Church of the Incarnation in 1852 and built its own sanctuary, and the chapel, which is no longer extant, was renamed the Church of the Atonement.

Grace's second chapel was located at 132 East 14th Street between Third and Fourth Avenues and was built in 1861. This Renwick designed Chapel (later Church) of the Redemption burned down in 1872. The next chapel was built on the same site, designed by Potter & Robinson, and was used as a community center for the indigent residents of the area, providing classes in English and other educational programs geared to the immigrant population. The second chapel is also no longer extant.

Finally, Grace Church built a chapel and hospital at 406 East 14th Street between First Avenue and Avenue A, both designed by Barney & Chapman. This was closed in 1943 and sold to the Roman Catholic Archdiocese of New York, which converted it into the Church of the Immaculate Conception and Clergy Houses. This complex still exists, and is New York City landmark and on the National Register of Historic Places.

=== Grace Church School ===
Grace Church School, which is now located at 86 Fourth Avenue, and also occupies the church houses to the north of it in the complex, was organized in 1894, and was the first place where choir boys could receive formal training for their duties. The day school began in 1934, and the school now offers complete secondary education for boys and girls from pre-K to twelfth grade.

In 2006, the School became a legal entity separate from the Church, and owns the buildings on Fourth Avenue from #84-96, which includes Clergy House, Memorial House and Neighborhood House. The Church owns #80 (Huntington Close), as well as #100 and 102, two red-brick buildings north of the landmarked church houses.

Grace Church School's high school building is located in Cooper Square. It opened in 2011.

== Services and programs ==
Grace Church offers a full schedule of prayer and Eucharist services throughout the week and is also available for special occasions such as weddings and baptisms. The church has a history of providing social services to its congregants and the surrounding neighborhood: it is thought that the church provided the first day-care center in New York City, located in Renwick's Memorial House on Fourth Avenue. Today, the church provides services including a community outreach program, spiritual education classes for adults, and children and youth services. A shelter for homeless men is located in one of the church's Fourth Avenue buildings.

The church is known for its Choir of Men and Boys, which was established in 1894, and its rich musical program which includes regular organ recitals.

== Personnel ==
=== Rectors ===
- Jonathan Mayhew Wainwright (third rector) – promoted mission churches throughout New York state and elsewhere in the U.S., established a Charity School for Girls and one for Boys, both in 1823
- Thomas House Taylor (fourth rector) – moved the church uptown to its current location
- Henry Codman Potter (fifth rector) – promoted the Social Gospel, expanding the church's outreach to the poor and the immigrant community As the Bishop of New York, Potter began the long process of building the Cathedral of St. John the Divine.
- William Reed Huntington (sixth rector) – known as "the First Presbyter of the Episcopal Church", promulgated the Chicago-Lambeth Quadrilateral and worked on revising the Book of Common Prayer, expanded the church complex and continued the Social Gospel with the Chapel and Hospital on 14th Street.
- Charles Lewis Slattery (seventh rector) – chaired the commission that eventually published the 1928 Book of Common Prayer. After leaving Grace Church, he served as Bishop of Massachusetts from 1927 until his death in 1930.
- Walter Russell Bowie (eighth rector) – scholar and prolific author who would later serve on the editorial board of the Interpreter's Dictionary of the Bible and the group that produced the Revised Standard Version (RSV) of the Bible. Upon leaving Grace Church he became professor of preaching at Union Theological Seminary (New York City) and then Virginia Theological Seminary (Alexandria, VA).
- C. FitzSimons Allison (eleventh rector) – later became the Bishop of South Carolina.

=== Clergy ===
- The Reverend J. Donald Waring, Rector
  - The Reverend Chase Danford, Associate Rector
  - The Reverend Julia Offinger, Assistant Rector for Youth and Family Ministry
  - Dr. Patrick Allen, Organist and Master of Choristers

=== Organists ===
- Samuel Prowse Warren, organist at Grace Church from 1868-1874 and 1876-1894

== Notable parishioners ==
- Polly Holliday - actress; sang in the choir and oversaw a chamber music series there as well.

== Notable weddings ==
- Consuelo Yznaga (godmother of Consuelo Vanderbilt) married George Montagu, the then Viscount Mandeville, on May 22, 1876.
- Cornelia Martin married William Craven, 4th Earl of Craven on April 18, 1893.

== See also ==
- Jules Edouard Roiné
- Isaac H. Brown, sexton at the Grace Church
- List of National Historic Landmarks in New York City
- List of New York City Designated Landmarks in Manhattan below 14th Street
- National Register of Historic Places listings in Manhattan below 14th Street
- Oak Hill Cemetery Chapel (Washington, D.C.), Gothic Revival chapel designed by Renwick
