= McKinley Tariff =

US law framed by William McKinley in 1890

- Long title: AN ACT to reduce the revenue and equalize duties on imports, and for other purposes.
- Enacted by: the 51st United States Congress
- Effective: October 6, 1890

Citations
- Statutes at Large: 26 Stat. 567

Legislative history
- Introduced in the House as H.R. 9416 by William Mckinley; Passed the House of Representatives on May 21, 1890 (164 to 142); Passed the Senate on September 10, 1890; Signed into law by President Benjamin Harrison on October 1, 1890

The Tariff Act of 1890, commonly called the McKinley Tariff, was an act of the United States Congress framed by then-Representative William McKinley, that became law on October 1, 1890. The tariff raised the average duty on imports to almost 50%, an increase designed to protect domestic industries and workers from foreign competition, as promised in the Republican platform. It represented protectionism, a policy supported by the Republicans and denounced by the Democrats. It was a major topic of fierce debate in the 1890 congressional elections, which gave a Democratic landslide victory. The Democrats replaced the McKinley Tariff with the Wilson–Gorman Tariff Act in 1894, which lowered tariff rates.

== Description ==
After 450 amendments, the Tariff Act of 1890 was passed and increased average duties across all imports from 38% to 49.5%. McKinley was known as the "Napoleon of Protection", and rates were raised on some goods and lowered on others, always in an attempt to protect American manufacturing interests. Changes in duties for specific products such as tinplates and wool were the most controversial ones and were emblematic of the spirit of the Tariff of 1890. The Act eliminated tariffs altogether on certain items, with the threat of reinstatement as an enticement to get other countries to lower their tariffs on items imported from the US.

=== Eliminated tariffs ===
The Act removed tariffs on sugar, molasses, tea, coffee, and hides but authorized the President to reinstate the tariffs if the items were exported from countries that treated U.S. exports in a "reciprocally unequal and unreasonable" fashion. The idea was "to secure reciprocal trade" by allowing the executive branch to use the threat of reimposing tariffs as a means to get other countries to lower their tariffs on U.S. exports. Although this delegation of power had the appearance of being an unconstitutional violation of the nondelegation doctrine, it was upheld by the Supreme Court in Field v. Clark in 1892, as authorizing the executive to act merely as an "agent" of Congress, rather than as a lawmaker itself. The President did not use the delegated power to re-impose tariffs on the five types of imported goods, but he used the threat of doing so to pass 10 treaties in which other countries reduced their tariffs on U.S. goods.

=== Tin-plates ===
Tin-plates were a major import for the United States. Tens of millions of dollars in these goods entered the country each year. In the preceding 20 years, tariff rates had been raised and dropped multiple times on tin-plates with no change in import levels, and domestic production had remained inconsequential. In a last attempt to stimulate the infant domestic tin-plate industry, the Act raised the duty level from 30% to 70%. It also included a unique provision that stated tin-plates should be admitted free of any duty after 1897 unless domestic production in any year reached one-third of the imports in that year. The goal was for the duty to be protective or not to exist at all.

=== Wool ===
The new tariff provisions for wool and woolen goods were exceedingly protectionist. Wool was previously taxed based on a schedule: more valuable wool was taxed at a higher rate. Through a multitude of complicated tariff schedule revisions, the Act made almost all woolen goods subject to the maximum duty rate. The Act also increased the tariff on carpet wool, a wool of very low quality not produced in the US. The government wanted to ensure that importers were not declaring higher-quality wool as carpet wool to evade the tariff.

== Background ==
Tariffs (taxes on foreign goods entering a country, paid by the importer and passed on to consumers) served two purposes for the United States in the late 19th century. One was to raise revenue for the federal government, and the other was to protect domestic manufacturers and workers from foreign competition, known as protectionism. In December 1887, President Grover Cleveland, a Democrat, devoted his entire State of the Union Address to the issue of the tariff and called emphatically for the reduction of duties and the abolition of duties on raw materials. The speech succeeded in making the tariff and the idea of protectionism a true party matter. In the 1888 election, the Republicans were victorious with the election of Benjamin Harrison and majorities in both the Senate and the House. For the sake of holding the party line, the Republicans felt obligated to pass stronger tariff legislation.

William McKinley of Ohio was defeated by Thomas Brackett Reed to be Speaker of the House after the 1888 elections. McKinley instead became chairman of the House Ways and Means Committee and was responsible for framing a new tariff bill. He believed that a protectionist tariff had been mandated by the people through the election and that it was necessary for America's wealth and prosperity. In addition to the protectionist debate, politicians were concerned about the high revenue accruing from tariffs. After the American Civil War, tariffs remained elevated to raise revenue and to cover the high costs of the war. By the early 1880s, the federal government was running a large surplus. Both parties agreed that the surplus needed to lessen but disagreed about whether to raise or lower tariffs to accomplish the same goal. The Democrats' hypothesis stated that tariff revenue could be reduced by reducing the tariff rate. Conversely, the Republicans' belief was that by increasing the tariff, imports would be lessened, and total tariff revenue would drop. The debate would be known as the Great Tariff Debate of 1888.

== Reactions ==
The tariff was not well received by Americans who suffered a steep increase in prices. In the 1890 election, Republicans lost their majority in the House with the number of seats they won reduced by nearly half, from 171 to 88. In the 1892 presidential election, Harrison was soundly defeated by Grover Cleveland, and the Senate, House, and Presidency were all under Democratic control. Lawmakers immediately started drafting new tariff legislation, and in 1894, the Wilson-Gorman Tariff passed, which lowered US tariff averages. The 1890 tariff was also poorly received abroad. Protectionists in the British Empire used it to argue for tariff retaliation and imperial trade preference.

== Effects ==
Douglas Irwin's 1998 paper examines the validity of the opposing tariff hypotheses posed by Republicans and Democrats in 1890. The Democrats proposed reductions in import duties. They believed that this would reduce government revenue, ease the tax burden on consumers and farmers, and eliminate inequities associated with special interest protection. The Republicans, by contrast, argued that any tariff reduction would stimulate imports and raise even more revenue. The Republicans proposed higher tariffs to achieve the dual objectives of reducing government revenue and protecting American industry from import competition.

Irwin analyzed historical data to estimate import demand elasticities and export supply elasticities for the United States in the years before 1888. He calculated that tariffs had not yet reached the maximum revenue rate, suggesting that a reduction, rather than an increase, in tariffs would have reduced both revenue and the federal surplus. This finding supported the Democrats’ hypothesis (a tariff reduction leads to less government revenue) and refuted the Republicans’ (higher tariffs lead to less government revenue).

Irwin further analyzed tariff revenue data and observed that total revenue decreased by about 4%, from $225 million to $215 million, after the 1890 Tariff increased rates. He attributed this drop largely to the provision that moved raw sugar to the duty-free list. Since sugar was the top revenue-generating import at the time, making it duty-free caused a significant revenue reduction. Irwin also calculated that if sugar were excluded from import calculations, tariff revenue actually increased by 7.8%, from $170 million to $183 million. He concluded that the tariff hastened the development of domestic tinplate production by about a decade but argued that the benefit to this industry was outweighed by the overall cost to consumers.

== See also ==
- Panic of 1893, while the high tariffs were in effect.
