= List of United States Supreme Court cases, volume 491 =

This is a list of all the United States Supreme Court cases from volume 491 of the United States Reports:

Case name	Citation	Date decided
Pennsylvania v. Union Gas Co.	491 U.S. 1	1989
Will v. Michigan Department of State Police	491 U.S. 58	1989
Quinn v. Millsap	491 U.S. 95	1989
1. The fact that a government board exists only to recommend a plan of reorganization that will be voted upon and does not enact any laws of its own does not immunize the board from equal protection scrutiny.; 2. A land-ownership requirement for appointment to a government board violates the Equal Protection Clause.
Michael H. v. Gerald D.	491 U.S. 110	1989
Patterson v. McLean Credit Union	491 U.S. 164	1989
Dellmuth v. Muth	491 U.S. 223	1989
Colonial Am. Life Ins. Co. v. Comm'r	491 U.S. 244	1989
Carella v. California	491 U.S. 263	1989
Missouri v. Jenkins	491 U.S. 274	1989
Consol. Rail Corp. v. Ry. Labor Executives' Ass'n	491 U.S. 299	1989
Healy v. Beer Institute	491 U.S. 324	1989
N.O. Pub. Serv. Inc. v. City of New Orleans	491 U.S. 350	1989
Jones v. Thomas	491 U.S. 376	1989
Texas v. Johnson	491 U.S. 397	1989
Public Citizen v. Department of Justice	491 U.S. 440	1989
Pitts. & Lake Erie R. Co. v. Ry. Labor Executives' Ass'n	491 U.S. 490	1989
Fla. Star v. B. J. F.	491 U.S. 524	1989
United States v. Zolin	491 U.S. 554	1989
Massachusetts v. Oakes	491 U.S. 576	1989
United States v. Monsanto	491 U.S. 600	1989
Caplin & Drysdale, Chartered v. United States	491 U.S. 617	1989
Harte-Hanks Communications, Inc. v. Connaughton	491 U.S. 657	1989
Jett v. Dallas Independent School Dist.	491 U.S. 701	1989
Flight Attendants v. Zipes	491 U.S. 754	1989
District courts may award Title VII attorney's fees against those who are not charged with Title VII violations but intervene to protect their own rights only where the intervention is frivolous, unreasonable, or without foundation.
Ward v. Rock Against Racism	491 U.S. 781	1989
