= Field v. Clark =

1891 US Supreme Court case

- Supreme Court of the United States

Argued November 30 and December 1-2, 1891 Decided February 29, 1892
- Full case name: Marshall Field & Co. v. John M. Clark, Collector for the Port of Chicago
- Citations: 143 U.S. 649 (more)

Holding
- Congress may delegate application of trade barriers to the President. The version of a bill signed by the President is authoritative.

Court membership
- Chief Justice Melville Fuller Associate Justices Stephen J. Field · John M. Harlan; Horace Gray · Samuel Blatchford; Lucius Q. C. Lamar II · David J. Brewer; Henry B. Brown

Case opinions
- Majority: Harlan, joined by Field, Gray, Blatchford, Brewer, and Brown
- Concurrence: Lamar (in judgement), joined by Fuller

Laws applied
- McKinley Tariff

Field v. Clark, 143 U.S. 649 (1891), is an early United States Supreme Court administrative law case declining to apply the nondelegation doctrine to the McKinley Tariff. This case also clarified that the version of a law signed by the President would be treated as authoritative, regardless of discrepancies from congressional records.

== Background ==
In October 1890, Congress passed the McKinley Tariff, authorizing the President to set import tariffs on any country producing sugar, molasses, coffee, tea, and/or hides if that nation has its own tariffs on American exports. Marshall Field & Co. sued John M. Clark, the collector for the Port of Chicago, to recover the money that it paid to import various goods under the argument that Congress cannot delegate its legislative authority to the Executive Branch.

Second, the US Constitution requires that "each House shall keep a journal of its proceedings," though it does not specify whether these journals are the authoritative record of laws passed by Congress. The version of the McKinley Tariff in these journals included a section not found in the bill signed by President Benjamin Harrison, which Marshall Field & Co. cited as further justification for invalidating the law.

== Supreme Court ==
The Supreme Court unanimously agreed that importers could not recover their tariff-associated costs simply because the rates were set by an agency, rather than Congress. Writing for the majority, Associate Justice John Marshall Harlan cited seven prior instances of Congress delegating application of trade barriers to the president between 1794 and 1866. Thus, the majority held that the McKinley Tariff was a constitutional use of Congress' authority over tariffs.

Second, the constitutional record-keeping requirement was construed as solely relating to public transparency. Considering it unlikely that the Speaker of the House of Representatives, Vice President of the United States (who acts as President of the Senate), and President would all conspire to modify laws passed by Congress, the Supreme Court assumed that the journal was incorrect.

=== Concurrence ===
Concurring with the judgement, Associate Justice Lucius Quintus Cincinnatus Lamar was joined by Chief Justice Melville Fuller in arguing that the President could not be authorized to perform Congress' enumerated Taxing and Spending Clause powers. Lamar distinguished this delegation of legislative authority from the form approved in Cargo of the Brig Aurora v. United States (1813), highlighting that the McKinley Tariff relied on greater discretion of trade conditions.
