= Isaac H. Brown =

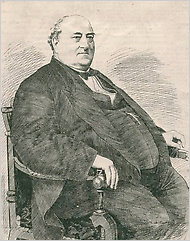

Isaac H. Brown (1812-1880) was the sexton at Grace Church in Greenwich Village, and arbiter of style in Manhattan where he planned weddings, arranged soirées and funerals for the wealthy of New York City. His contribution to high society was so essential, a society journalist reported in 1850, that without him, "the ladies of our fashionable world would be at a loss to fill up their lists, the young gentlemen be without a patron, the carriages would stray about like lost sheep, the servants be wayward and fitful in their movements, and the whole charm of our social assemblages be gone."
