= List of United States Supreme Court cases, volume 143 =

Supreme Court of the United States
- Interactive map of Supreme Court of the United States
- 38°53′26″N 77°00′16″W
- Established: March 4, 1789; 236 years ago
- Location: Washington, D.C.
- Coordinates: 38°53′26″N 77°00′16″W
- Composition method: Presidential nomination with Senate confirmation
- Authorised by: Constitution of the United States, Art. III, § 1
- Judge term length: life tenure, subject to impeachment and removal
- Number of positions: 9 (by statute)
- Website: supremecourt.gov

This is a list of cases reported in volume 143 of United States Reports, decided by the Supreme Court of the United States in 1892.

== Justices of the Supreme Court at the time of volume 143 U.S. ==
The Supreme Court is established by Article III, Section 1 of the Constitution of the United States, which says: "The judicial Power of the United States, shall be vested in one supreme Court . . .". The size of the Court is not specified; the Constitution leaves it to Congress to set the number of justices. Under the Judiciary Act of 1789 Congress originally fixed the number of justices at six (one chief justice and five associate justices). Since 1789 Congress has varied the size of the Court from six to seven, nine, ten, and back to nine justices (always including one chief justice).

When the cases in volume 143 U.S. were decided the Court comprised the following eight members (Justice Joseph P. Bradley had died in January 1892):

Portrait	Justice	Office	Home State	Succeeded	Date confirmed by the Senate (Vote)	Tenure on Supreme Court
	Melville Fuller	Chief Justice	Illinois	Morrison Waite	July 20, 1888 (41–20)	October 8, 1888 – July 4, 1910 (Died)
	Stephen Johnson Field	Associate Justice	California	newly created seat	March 10, 1863 (Acclamation)	May 10, 1863 – December 1, 1897 (Retired)
	John Marshall Harlan	Associate Justice	Kentucky	David Davis	November 29, 1877 (Acclamation)	December 10, 1877 – October 14, 1911 (Died)
	Horace Gray	Associate Justice	Massachusetts	Nathan Clifford	December 20, 1881 (51–5)	January 9, 1882 – September 15, 1902 (Died)
	Samuel Blatchford	Associate Justice	New York	Ward Hunt	March 22, 1882 (Acclamation)	April 3, 1882 – July 7, 1893 (Died)
	Lucius Quintus Cincinnatus Lamar	Associate Justice	Mississippi	William Burnham Woods	January 16, 1888 (32–28)	January 18, 1888 – January 23, 1893 (Died)
	David Josiah Brewer	Associate Justice	Kansas	Stanley Matthews	December 18, 1889 (53–11)	January 6, 1890 – March 28, 1910 (Died)
	Henry Billings Brown	Associate Justice	Michigan	Samuel Freeman Miller	December 29, 1890 (Acclamation)	January 5, 1891 – May 28, 1906 (Retired)

== Citation style ==
Under the Judiciary Act of 1789 the federal court structure at the time comprised District Courts, which had general trial jurisdiction; Circuit Courts, which had mixed trial and appellate (from the US District Courts) jurisdiction; and the United States Supreme Court, which had appellate jurisdiction over the federal District and Circuit courts—and for certain issues over state courts. The Supreme Court also had limited original jurisdiction (i.e., in which cases could be filed directly with the Supreme Court without first having been heard by a lower federal or state court). There were one or more federal District Courts and/or Circuit Courts in each state, territory, or other geographical region.

The Judiciary Act of 1891 created the United States Courts of Appeals and reassigned the jurisdiction of most routine appeals from the district and circuit courts to these appellate courts. The Act created nine new courts that were originally known as the "United States Circuit Courts of Appeals." The new courts had jurisdiction over most appeals of lower court decisions. The Supreme Court could review either legal issues that a court of appeals certified or decisions of court of appeals by writ of certiorari. The change resulted in an immediate reduction in the Supreme Court's workload (from 623 cases filed in 1890 to 379 in 1891 and 275 in 1892).

Bluebook citation style is used for case names, citations, and jurisdictions.

- "# Cir." = United States Court of Appeals
  - e.g., "3d Cir." = United States Court of Appeals for the Third Circuit
- "C.C.D." = United States Circuit Court for the District of . . .
  - e.g.,"C.C.D.N.J." = United States Circuit Court for the District of New Jersey
- "D." = United States District Court for the District of . . .
  - e.g.,"D. Mass." = United States District Court for the District of Massachusetts
- "E." = Eastern; "M." = Middle; "N." = Northern; "S." = Southern; "W." = Western
  - e.g.,"C.C.S.D.N.Y." = United States Circuit Court for the Southern District of New York
  - e.g.,"M.D. Ala." = United States District Court for the Middle District of Alabama
- "Ct. Cl." = United States Court of Claims
- The abbreviation of a state's name alone indicates the highest appellate court in that state's judiciary at the time.
  - e.g.,"Pa." = Supreme Court of Pennsylvania
  - e.g.,"Me." = Supreme Judicial Court of Maine

== List of cases in volume 143 U.S. ==
Case Name	Page & year	Opinion of the Court	Concurring opinion(s)	Dissenting opinion(s)	Lower Court	Disposition
Louisville W. Co. v. Clark	1 (1892)	Harlan	none	none	Ky.	affirmed
District of Columbia v. Hutton	18 (1892)	Lamar	none	none	Sup. Ct. D.C.	affirmed
National S.S. Co. v. Tugman	28 (1892)	Brown	none	none	C.C.E.D.N.Y.	affirmed
Sioux City et al. Co. v. Griffey	32 (1892)	Brewer	none	none	Iowa	affirmed
New Orleans P. Ry Co. v. Parker	42 (1892)	Brown	none	none	C.C.W.D. La.	reversed
New York et al. R.R. Co. v. Winter's Adm'r	60 (1892)	Lamar	none	none	C.C.D. Mass.	affirmed
United States v. Witten	76 (1892)	Gray	none	none	C.C.W.D. Va.	reversed
Tyler v. Savage	79 (1892)	Blatchford	none	none	C.C.E.D. Va.	affirmed
Smale v. Mitchell	99 (1892)	Field	none	none	C.C.N.D. Ill.	certification
In re Rapier	110 (1892)	Fuller	none	none	C.C.E.D. La.	habeas corpus denied
Boyd v. Nebraska ex rel. Thayer	135 (1892)	Fuller	none	Field	Neb.	reversed
Union M.L. Ins. Co. v. Hanford	187 (1892)	Gray	none	none	C.C.N.D. Ill.	affirmed
New Orleans et al. R.R. Co. v. City of New Orleans	192 (1892)	Gray	none	none	La.	affirmed
Waterman v. Alden	196 (1892)	Gray	none	none	C.C.N.D. Ill.	affirmed
In re Woods	202 (1892)	Fuller	none	none	C.C.D. Minn.	certiorari denied
Horner v. United States I	207 (1892)	Blatchford	none	none	C.C.S.D.N.Y.	affirmed
Lawrence v. Nelson	215 (1892)	Gray	none	none	C.C.N.D. Ill.	affirmed
Hammond v. Hopkins	224 (1892)	Fuller	none	none	Sup. Ct. D.C.	reversed
Barbed Wire Patent Case	275 (1892)	Brown	none	Field	C.C.N.D. Iowa	reversed
Michigan Ins. Bank v. Eldred	293 (1892)	Gray	none	none	C.C.E.D. Wis.	reversed
Ludeling v. Chaffe	301 (1892)	Gray	none	none	La.	dismissed
Horn Silver M. Co. v. People	305 (1892)	Field	none	none	N.Y. Sup. Ct.	affirmed
Chandler v. Pomeroy	318 (1892)	Brown	none	none	C.C.D.N.J.	reversed
Chicago et al. Ry. Co. v. Wellman	339 (1892)	Brewer	none	none	Mich.	affirmed
Briggs v. United States	346 (1892)	Field	none	none	Ct. Cl.	reversed
Nebraska v. Iowa	359 (1892)	Brewer	none	none	original	boundary set
Winona et al. R.R. Co. v. Town of Plainview	371 (1892)	Blatchford	none	none	Minn.	dismissed
Iron S.M. Co. v. Mike et al. Co.	394 (1892)	Brewer	none	none	C.C.D. Colo.	affirmed
Sullivan v. Iron S.M. Co.	431 (1892)	Brewer	Field	none	C.C.D. Colo.	affirmed
Schwab v. Berggren	442 (1892)	Harlan	none	none	C.C.N.D. Ill.	affirmed
Fielden v. Illinois	452 (1892)	Harlan	none	none	Ill.	affirmed
Church of Holy Trinity v. United States	457 (1892)	Brewer	none	none	C.C.S.D.N.Y.	reversed
In re Cooper	472 (1892)	Fuller	none	none	D. Alaska	prohibition denied
The Sylvia Handy	513 (1892)	Fuller	none	none	D. Alaska	affirmed
Budd v. People	517 (1892)	Blatchford	none	Brewer	N.Y. Sup. Ct.	affirmed
Hoyt v. Latham	553 (1892)	Brown	none	none	C.C.D. Minn.	reversed
Horner v. United States II	570 (1892)	Blatchford	none	none	C.C.S.D.N.Y.	affirmed
Dunwoody v. United States	578 (1892)	Harlan	none	none	Ct. Cl.	affirmed
Gandy v. Main B. Co.	587 (1892)	Brown	none	none	C.C.E.D. Pa.	reversed
Chicago et al. Ry. Co. v. Denver et al. R.R. Co.	596 (1892)	Brown	none	Brewer	C.C.D. Ohio	affirmed
United States v. Texas	621 (1892)	Harlan	none	Fuller	original	jurisdiction confirmed
Field v. Clark	649 (1892)	Harlan	Lamar	none	C.C.N.D. Ill.	affirmed
