= Neutral reportage =

Common law practice

Neutral reportage is a common law defense against libel and defamation lawsuits usually involving the media republishing unproven accusations about public figures. It is a limited exception to the common law rule that one who repeats a defamatory statement is just as guilty as the first person who published it.

Defendants using the defense can claim that they are not implying the offending statement is true but simply reporting, in a neutral manner, that the potentially libelous statements were made, even if they doubt the accuracy of the statement. For the defense to succeed, the reporting must generally be unbiased and serve the public interest.

== History ==
In U.S. defamation law it is traditional for a court to consider the publishing and re-publishing of defamatory statements indistinguishable on the grounds that the republished statements have potential to cause as much harm to a person as the original publication. The doctrine of neutral reportage was established on the basis that the press should not be liable for republishing allegations made by a responsible speaker about public figures providing it is done in a neutral manner and is newsworthy.

=== Edwards v. National Audubon Society ===
The case of Edwards v. National Audubon Society in 1977 is largely recognised as the first major case in which the idea of neutral reporting was used. The case concerned the reporting of a dispute between the National Audubon Society and a group of scientists that it had accused of being paid to lie by pesticide companies regarding the effects of pesticides on birds. The New York Times, while attempting to report both sides of the dispute, was sued by several of the scientists. A federal appellate court recognised that the reporting was both neutral and in the public interest.

=== United States law ===
The neutral reportage privilege has not been widely adopted by all states and courts. U.S. District Judge Marilyn Patel stated that "there is a great deal of inconsistency among state court decisions" In 1981, during the case of McCall vs. Courier Journal, the Kentucky Supreme Court rejected the defense stating it had not been approved by the U.S. Supreme Court, which in turn refused to review the case. In 2004, Pennsylvania Supreme Court ruled that neither the Pennsylvania constitution nor the United States Constitution provided such a defense. These two states together with Michigan, New York and California have rejected the defense while Florida is among the few states that has accepted it. Whereas in Illinois one appellate court recognised the principle and another did not demonstrating the inconsistency of the defense even within the same state.

=== United Kingdom law ===
In the United Kingdom, the defense is often known as the 'Reynolds defence' after a 1994 case, where then Irish Taoiseach Albert Reynolds sued the Sunday Times over an article claiming he had misled parliament. The case was a landmark in British libel law after the House of Lords decided in 1997 to allow the media to plead the 'Reynolds defence' meaning they could print potential libel if they could prove that it is in the public interest and responsible. According to the libel book Gatley on Libel and Slander it "extends at least to the attributed and neutral reporting of allegations and counter allegations by parties to a political dispute in which the public has a legitimate interest."

== Notable cases ==
While the validity of the defense is questioned, it has been used successfully in some cases while in others the defendants have failed to convince judges that they are protected by the defense.

=== Failures ===
- Troy Publishing Co. v. Norton, 2005
- Khalid Iqbal Khawar v. Globe International Inc.
- George Galloway MP vs. Telegraph Group Ltd (see George Galloway#Daily Telegraph libel case)

=== Successes ===
- Edwards v. National Audubon Society, 1977
- Al-Fagih v. HH Saudi Research & Marketing (UK) Ltd, 2001 (on appeal)
- Christopher and Barry Roberts v. Searchlight Magazine
- Global Relief Foundation vs. multiple defendants all reporters or news organizations including New York Times, ABC, Boston Globe and Associated Press (on appeal)
- Watson v. Leach, 1996 - Newspaper report that a state auditor accused a town trustee of faking a snow emergency to gain access to emergency funds.
- Celebrezze v. Netzley, 1988 - A newspaper report that a political campaign brochure accused the county's Italian-American judges of having mafia connections.
- McCracken v. Gainesville Tribune, Inc., 1978 - A land developer calling another developer "unscrupulous" during a town meeting.

==== Barbara Schwarz v. The Salt Lake Tribune ====
In May 2003 the Salt Lake Tribune, of Salt Lake City, Utah, published an article entitled "S.L. Woman's Quest Strains Public Records System" documenting Salt Lake City resident Barbara Schwarz's extensive pursuit of FOIA records.

Schwarz sued the Tribune, claiming that its use of “yellow journalism” resulted in “malicious defamation”, “emotional abuse” and was accomplished by deceiving her into giving an interview, unauthorized use of her photo, violation of privacy, refusing to print a correction or letter to the editor, in addition to theft of approximately 100 photos and negatives.

In its ruling the three member court stated: "The public interest in being fully informed about controversies that often rage around sensitive issues demands that the press be afforded the freedom to report such charges without assuming responsibility for them.” Judge James Z. Davis further wrote that the Tribune article was protected by "the neutral reportage privilege because it contains 'accurate and disinterested reporting' of the information contained in the record." Her suit was dismissed and her appeals denied.

== See also ==
- Qualified privilege
- First Amendment to the United States Constitution
- Freedom of the press
