= Robert Reginald Livingston =

American politician and farmer from New York

Member of the New York State Assembly for Columbia County
- In office January 1, 1923 – December 31, 1923
- Preceded by: Roscoe C. Waterbury
- Succeeded by: Lewis F. Harder

Personal details
- Born: August 4, 1888 Clermont, New York, U.S.
- Died: November 7, 1962 (aged 74) Hudson, New York, U.S.
- Party: Democrat
- Spouse(s): Alice Delafield Dean (m. 1922; div. 1932) Dorothy Champion Farrar Hutton (after 1945)
- Relations: Edward De Peyster Livingston (uncle); Goodhue Livingston (uncle); Earl E. T. Smith (cousin); Edward Neufville Tailer (grandfather)
- Children: Susan P. Livingston
- Parent(s): Robert Reginald Livingston; Mary Elizabeth Tailer
- Education: Princeton University; Columbia Law School

Robert Reginald Livingston Jr. (August 4, 1888 – November 7, 1962), was an American politician and farmer from New York.

== Early life ==
Livingston was born on August 4, 1888, at Clermont in Columbia County. He was a son of Robert Reginald Livingston Sr. (1858–1899) of Northwood, and Mary Elizabeth (née Tailer) Livingston (1863–1944). After his father's death, his mother lived at her New York home, 11 Washington Square North (built by her grandfather Thomas Suffern in 1833, and host to President Ulysses S. Grant in her childhood) and later at 1192 Park Avenue. His sister, Laura Suffern Livingston, married Howland Shippen Davis (executive vice president of the New York Stock Exchange), in 1914. They owned the "Teviot" estate (built in 1843 by Eugene Livingston) in Tivoli, which their son Howland later sold to Jann Wenner, publisher of Rolling Stone magazine.

A member of the prominent Livingston family, his paternal grandparents were Robert Edward Livingston (son of New York State Senator and 11th Lt. Gov. of New York Edward Philip Livingston and Elizabeth Stevens Livingston, the eldest daughter of Chancellor Robert R. Livingston) and Susan Maria (née de Peyster) Livingston (sister of Frederic James de Peyster). Among his extended family were uncles Edward De Peyster Livingston (a lawyer who was included in Ward McAllister's "Four Hundred" in 1892) and Goodhue Livingston, an architect with Trowbridge & Livingston who designed the Hayden Planetarium. His maternal grandparents were Agnes (née Suffern) Tailer and Edward Neufville Tailer, a prominent merchant and banker. His aunt, Agnes Suffern Tailer, was married to U.S. Attorney Henry Lawrence Burnett, and his first cousin, Earl Edward Tailer Smith was a diplomat who served as U.S. Ambassador to Cuba and mayor of Palm Beach.

Livingston graduated from Princeton University in 1910 and Columbia Law School in 1914.

== Career ==
After his admission to the New York bar, he took up the practice of law with the firm of Hunt, Hill and Betts at 120 Broadway. During World War I, he served as a Lieutenant in the American Expeditionary Forces of the U.S. Army. He later became a fruit farmer in New York, growing mostly grapes and apples. He helped organize and served as president of the Germantown Cold Storage Company, the first large commercial storage in the Hudson Valley, as well as founder and president the Germantown National Bank.

=== Political career ===
He was the Democratic candidate to represent Columbia County in the New York State Assembly in the years 1920, 1921, 1923, 1924, 1925. He was defeated each time except for 1922, when he was elected to succeed Republican Roscoe C. Waterbury for the 146th New York State Legislature in 1923. Livingston was replaced by Republican Lewis F. Harder.

In 1928, he was candidate for U.S. Representative to represent New York's 27th congressional district, losing to Republican Harcourt J. Pratt. In 1932, he was an alternate delegate to Democratic National Convention from New York, and served as chair of Columbia County Democratic Party in 1953.

== Personal life ==
On February 23, 1922, Livingston was married to Alice Delafield Dean (1900–1975) by Bishop William T. Manning at St. James Church in New York City. She was a daughter of Philip S. Dean of 790 Park Avenue and Annandale in Dutchess County. Before their divorce in 1932, they lived at 1192 Park Avenue where his wife hosted large parties, and were the parents of one daughter, Susan P. Livingston (b. 1926)

In January 1945, Robert, his sister, and their cousin Goodhue Livingston Jr., sold a piece of property located northwest corner of Sixth Avenue and 53rd Street in Manhattan. The inherited property was purchased by their grandfather, Robert E. Livingston, for $4,400 in 1863 and had been in the family since.

On March 3, 1945, he remarried to Dorothy Champion Farrar Hutton at the Second Church in Newton in West Newton, Massachusetts. Dorothy, who was born in England and attended private schools there, was a daughter of Walter F. Hutton.

Livingston, who lived at Northwood Farms until his death, died at Columbia Memorial Hospital in Hudson, New York on November 7, 1962.

New York State Assembly
Preceded by Roscoe C. Waterbury	New York State Assembly; Columbia County; 1923	Succeeded by Lewis F. Harder
