= John Henry Livingston (lawyer) =

American lawyer

- Born: July 8, 1848; Columbia County, New York, U.S.
- Died: January 27, 1927 (aged 78); Aiken, South Carolina, U.S.
- Education: Columbia College; Columbia Law School
- Spouses: Catherine Livingston Hamersley (m. 1871; died 1873) Emily Evans (m. 1880; died 1894) Alice Delafield Clarkson (m. 1906)
- Parent(s): Clermont Livingston; Cornelia Livingston
- Relatives: See Livingston family

John Henry Livingston (July 8, 1848 – January 27, 1927) was an American lawyer, proprietor of Clermont Manor, and prominent member of the Livingston family of New York.

== Early life and education ==
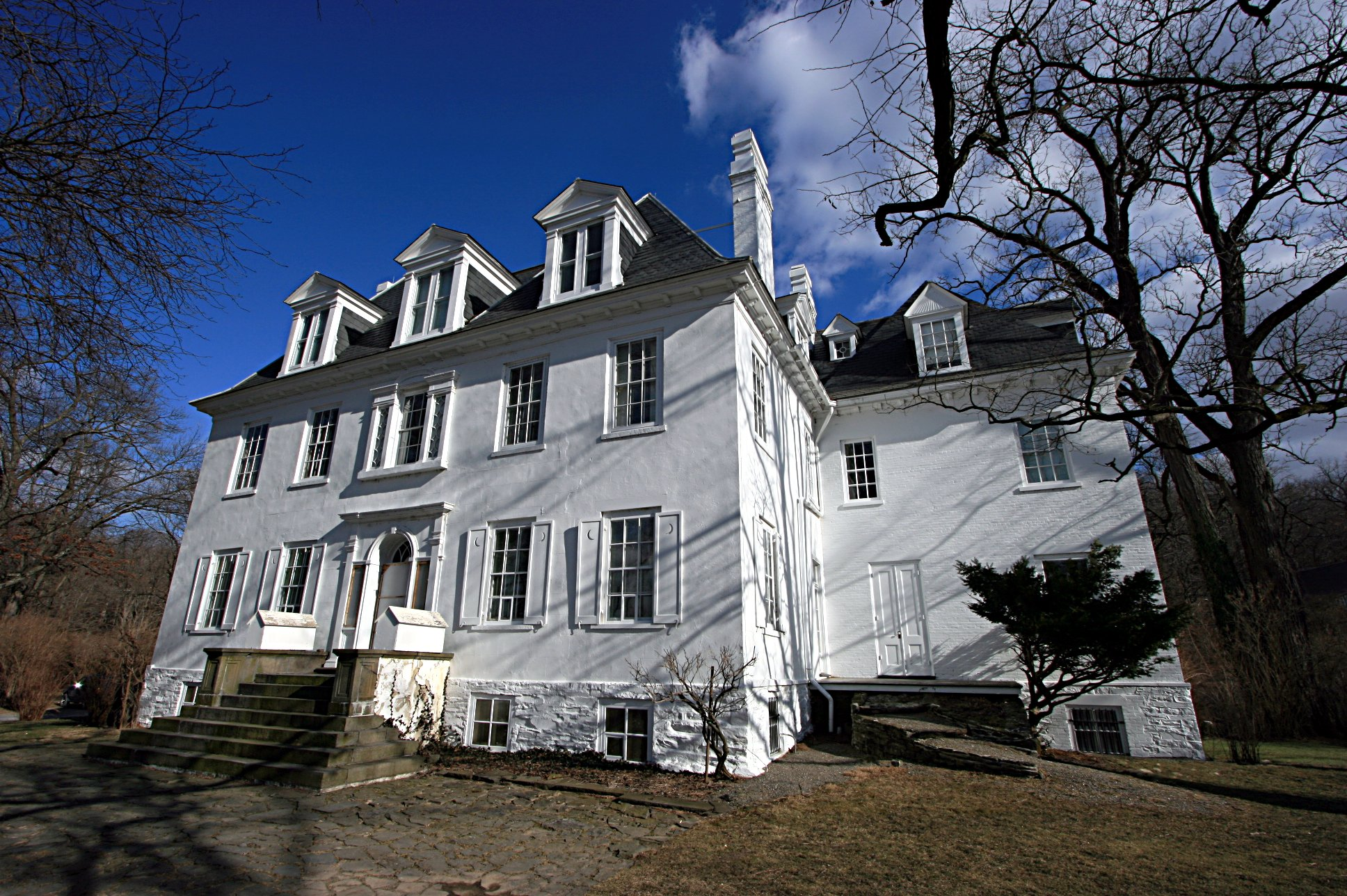
Livingston's birthplace, Clermont Manor in Columbia County, New York

Livingston was born on July 8, 1848, at Oakhill in Columbia County, New York. He was the only son of Clermont Livingston (1817–1895) and Cornelia Livingston (1824–1851), who were third cousins. Among his siblings was Mary Livingston, who married Col. Frederic de Peyster, a son of Maj. Gen. John Watts de Peyster. After his mother's death a short time after his birth, his father remarried to neighbor Mary Colden (née Swartout) Livingston.

His paternal grandparents were Lieutenant Governor of New York Edward Philip Livingston and Elizabeth Stevens Livingston, who was the eldest daughter of Chancellor Robert R. Livingston.

Livingston's father inherited Clermont Manor after the elder Livingston's death in 1843. His grandfather's second wife, the former Mary Crooke Broom, remarried to Judge Charles Herman Ruggles.

Among his many cousins was Thomas Streatfeild Clarkson, namesake of Clarkson University, Mary Livingston Ludlow, the mother of Anna (née Hall) Roosevelt and grandmother of First Lady Eleanor Roosevelt. He was a first cousin of Catharine Goodhue Livingston, Robert Robert Livingston, Edward De Peyster Livingston, and prominent architect Goodhue Livingston.

Livingston was educated at home by a Danish tutor, and then graduated from Columbia College in 1869, followed by Columbia Law School in 1871.

== Career and society life ==
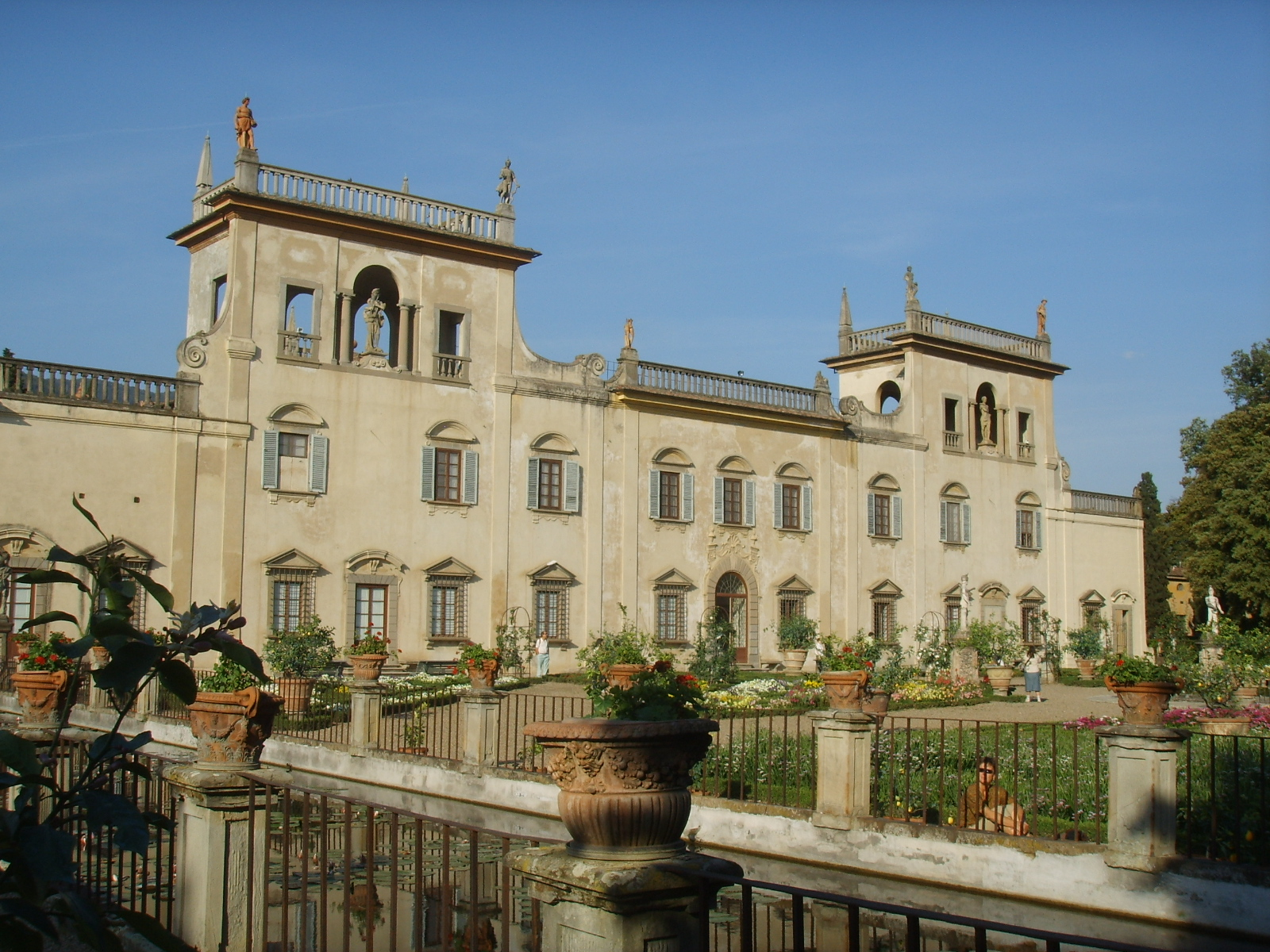
Villa Guicciardini Corsi Salviati in Sesto Fiorentino, Italy

After his father's death in 1895, Clermont Manor was left to his twenty-two year old daughter Katherine, reportedly due to his father's dislike of John Henry's second wife Emily, who died in 1894. Livingston eventually bought Clermont from his daughter, reportedly for $1.

Livingston served as President of the Colonial Lords of Manors in America and was an officer of the Society of the Cincinnati. He was also a member of the Sons of the Revolution, the Society of Colonial Wars, the St. Nicholas Society, the University Club and The Apawamis Club in Rye, New York.

He spent many years abroad, including a residence at the Villa Guicciardini in Florence.

== Personal life ==
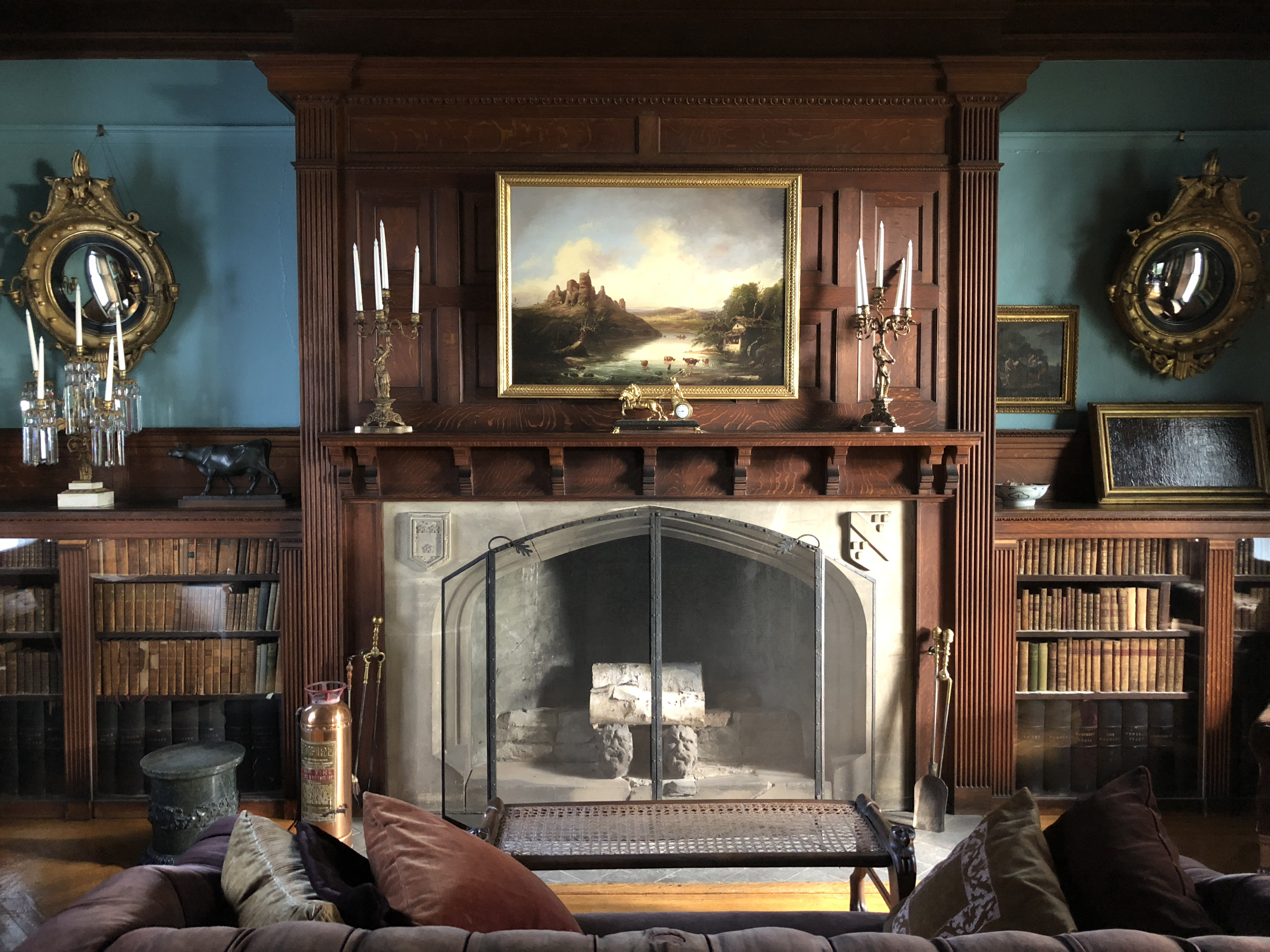
Livingston's living room at Clermont

On November 2, 1871, Livingston married Catherine Livingston Hamersley (1850–1873). Catherine was the sister of J. Hooker Hamersley, the daughter of John W. and Catherine Livingston (née Hooker) Hamersley, and granddaughter of Hon. James Hooker. Together, they were the parents of one daughter:

- Katharine Livingston Livingston (1873–1933), who married Lawrence Timpson (1865–1937) in 1900.

After Catherine's death from complications from childbirth on April 19, 1873, he married Emily Evans on October 30, 1880. Emily was the daughter of William E. Evans and niece of Mrs. Gouverneur Ogden, in Philadelphia. Livingston's best man at the wedding was Cadwalader E. Ogden of New York.

Emily died "very suddenly" on April 7, 1894, and Livingston married for the third and final time to Alice Delafield Clarkson (1872–1964), the daughter of Howard Clarkson, Esq., on November 9, 1906 at 58 West 37th Street in New York City. Together, they were the parents of two daughters:

- Honoria Alice Livingston (1909–2000), who married Reginald "Rex" McVitty in 1931.
- Janet Gloria Livingston (1910–1972), (Note: Janet is sometimes listed as "Janet Cornelia Livingston" rather than Janet Gloria Livingston.) who worked for the Chemical Trust Bank in New York and did not marry.

Livingston died of influenza-related illnesses at "The Bandbox", his winter residence in Aiken, South Carolina on January 27, 1927.

=== Descendants ===
Through his eldest daughter, he was the grandfather of five, including Theodore Livingston Timpson (1901–1965), Katharine Livingston Timpson (1903–1993), Robert Clermont Livingston Timpson (1908–1988), who married Louise Campbell, Duchess of Argyll in 1954, and was ousted from the New York Stock Exchange in 1963, J. Alistar Livingston Timpson (1915–1997), and H. Rosamund Livingston Timpson (1915–2004).
