= Earl E. T. Smith =

American diplomat (1903–1991)

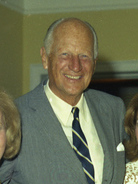

United States Ambassador to Cuba
- In office July 23, 1957 – January 19, 1959
- President: Dwight Eisenhower
- Preceded by: Arthur Gardner
- Succeeded by: Philip Bonsal

Personal details
- Born: Earl Edward Tailer Smith; July 8, 1903 Newport, Rhode Island, U.S.
- Died: February 15, 1991 (aged 87) Palm Beach, Florida, U.S.
- Party: Republican
- Spouses: Consuelo Vanderbilt (m. 1926; div. 1935) Mimi Elaine Richardson (m. 1936; div. 1939) Florence Pritchett (m. 1947; died 1965) Lesly H. Stockard (m. 1968)
- Relations: Robert Reginald Livingston (cousin); Edward Neufville Tailer (grandfather)
- Children: 3
- Parent(s): Fannie Bogert Tailer; Sydney Johnston Smith
- Education: Taft School
- Alma mater: Yale University

Military service
- Allegiance: United States
- Rank: Lieutenant colonel
- Battles/wars: World War II

Earl Edward Tailer Smith (July 8, 1903 – February 15, 1991) was an American financier and diplomat, who served as ambassador to Cuba from 1957 to 1959 and as mayor of Palm Beach from 1971 to 1977.

== Early life ==
Smith was born in Newport, Rhode Island on July 8, 1903. He was a son of Frances Bogert "Fannie" Tailer (1884–1953), and Sydney Johnston Smith (1868–1949), a cotton broker and sportsman. His parents divorced in 1909 and his mother remarried, to C. Whitney Carpenter in 1916. They also divorced.

Smith's maternal grandparents were Edward Neufville Tailer, a prominent merchant and banker, and Agnes Suffern (the daughter of Thomas Suffern). His aunt, Agnes Suffern Tailer Burnett, was the wife of U.S. Attorney Henry Lawrence Burnett. Another aunt, Mary Tailer Livingston, was the mother of New York Assemblyman Robert Reginald Livingston, a descendant of Chancellor Robert R. Livingston.

Smith was educated at the Taft School in Watertown, Connecticut, followed by Yale University in New Haven, Connecticut from 1926 to 1928.

== Career ==
Before becoming an investment broker and a member of the New York Stock Exchange, Smith was a founder of the investment brokers, Paige, Smith, and Remick in 1929, serving as senior partner until 1937 and remaining a member for more than 60 years.

In 1941, President Franklin D. Roosevelt appointed Smith as special assistant in the Office of Production Management (later War Production Board). He left this post to serve in the United States Army during the Second World War. Smith served overseas and by the end of the war, attained the rank of Lieutenant colonel.

As a successful businessman, Smith became the finance chairman of the Florida Republican Committee.

=== Ambassador to Cuba ===
In June 1957, President Dwight Eisenhower appointed Smith ambassador to Cuba, replacing Arthur Gardner. Smith was a businessman who had never held a diplomatic position and who did not speak Spanish. On arrival, Smith was urged by his staff to leave Havana to get a better feel of the country, which was in a state of some turmoil. On a visit to Santiago de Cuba, Smith witnessed firsthand the funeral and burial of Frank Pais, one of the leaders of the M-26-7 movement. After his death, well over 200,000 people attended the event, which convinced Smith that something had to be done about the dictatorship of Fulgencio Batista.

Smith was also critical of what he perceived as Washington's ambivalent attitude towards the growing 26th of July movement led by Fidel Castro. Smith felt that the CIA underestimated the strength of the revolutionary movement.

Smith resigned his post on January 20, 1959 and was replaced by Philip Bonsal, three weeks after the Cuban Revolution led by Castro.

From his 1962 book, The Fourth Floor, Smith’s remark is often quoted: “Whenever I asked President Batista for Cuba's vote to support the United States in the United Nations, he would instruct his Foreign Minister to have the Cuban delegation vote in accordance with the United States delegation and to give full support to the American delegation at the United Nations.”

=== Later life ===
In 1960, Smith testified to the Senate Committee on the subject of the "Communist threat to the United States through the Caribbean." During the hearings, Smith said, "Until Castro, the U.S. was so overwhelmingly influential in Cuba that the American ambassador was the second most important man, sometimes even more important than the Cuban president."

He also presented the lawmakers with the following options:

If we are to intervene sufficiently to bring about the overthrow of dictatorships, then we should intervene to whatever extent is required to fulfill our purpose. Otherwise, in my opinion, we must wait for the normal self-development of a people and not assist revolution. And we must be prepared to receive the criticism of supporting friendly governments recognized by the United States, although they have been labeled dictatorships. To make my point more clear, let me say that, we helped to overthrow the Batista dictatorship which was pro-American only to install the Castro dictatorship which is pro-Russian.

Smith was named the U.S. Ambassador to Switzerland by President Kennedy, but declined because Switzerland was charged with United States relations in Cuba. In the 1980s, he was named to the Presidential Commission on Broadcasting to Cuba by President Ronald Reagan alongside George W. Landau.

== Personal life ==
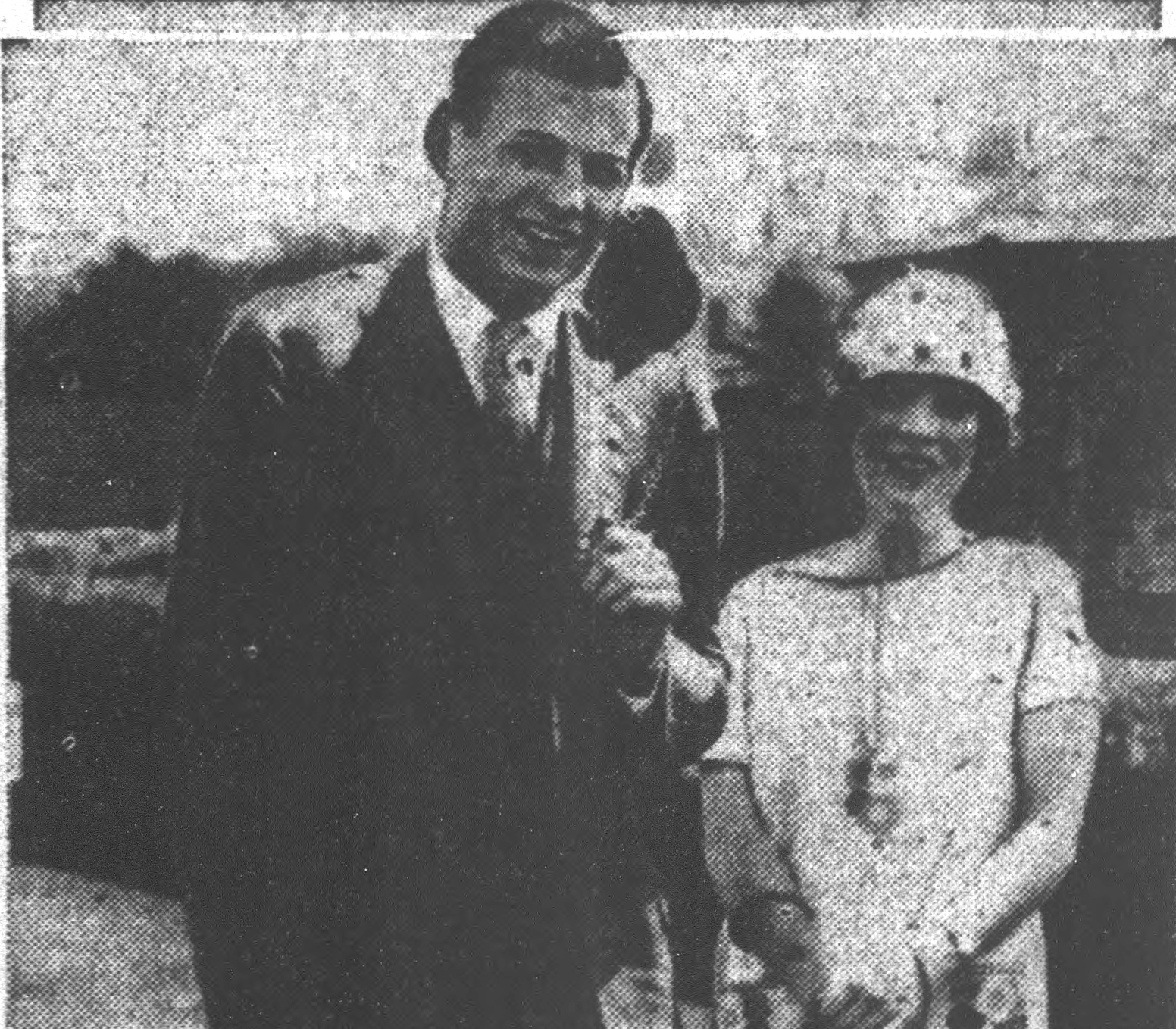
Smith with his first wife Consuelo Vanderbilt, 1926

Smith was married four times and divorced twice. His first marriage was on January 7, 1926 to Consuelo Vanderbilt (1903–2011), a daughter of the former Virginia Graham Fair and William Kissam Vanderbilt II. Consuelo, the sister of Muriel Vanderbilt, was also a granddaughter of William Kissam Vanderbilt, Alva Belmont, James Graham Fair, and a niece of Harold Stirling Vanderbilt and, her namesake, Consuelo Vanderbilt (the former Duchess of Marlborough from her marriage to Charles Spencer-Churchill, 9th Duke of Marlborough). Before their 1935 divorce, they were the parents of two daughters:

- Iris Vanderbilt Smith (1927–2006), who married Herbert Pratt Van Ingen, Augustus G. Paine III, Edwin F. Russell, and Donald C. Christ.
- Virginia Consuelo Smith (b. 1930), who married William Langdon Hutton and Edwin Marston Burke.

The year after their divorce, Consuelo remarried, to Henry Gassaway Davis III (the heir to a coal fortune who was recently divorced from Consuelo's cousin, Grace Vanderbilt, a daughter of Grace and Cornelius Vanderbilt III). Smith remarried to Mimi Elaine Richardson (1916–1995) on December 28, 1936. Mimi, a graduate of Miss Porter's, was a daughter of Courtlandt Richardson of New York. They divorced in November 1939, and she married William Gamble Woodward Jr. in December 1940.

In 1947, Smith married fashion model Florence Pritchett Canning (1920–1965). Flo, as she was known, was the former wife of Richard Canning. She and Canning divorced in 1943. She met John F. Kennedy in 1944. They may have dated, and remained friends through his presidency. Pritchett was also romantically linked with actors Robert Walker and Errol Flynn. In the 1940s she worked as the fashion editor for the New York Journal-American and wrote articles for Photoplay. She appeared as a panelist on the radio and TV program Leave It to the Girls from 1945 to 1953. Before her death in 1965, they were the parents of:

- Earl Edward Tailer Smith Jr. (b. 1953)

After the death of Smith Sr.’s third wife Florence from leukemia in 1965, he married for the fourth, and last, time to the former Lesly H. Stockard at the Atlanta County Courthouse in March 1968. Lesly, a daughter of Lester Napier Stockard, was the former wife of John Barker Hickox and James Langley Van Alen (son of Margaret Van Alen Bruguiére).

Smith died at his home in Palm Beach, Florida on February 15, 1991.

== Works ==
=== Books ===
- The Fourth Floor: An Account of the Castro Communist Revolution. New York: Random House (1962). LCCN 63-8331. OCLC 421720.
  - Reprint ed. includes introduction by Elliott Abrams (U.S. Cuba Institute Press, 1991). ISBN 978-0944273067.
  - 3rd ed. includes introduction by Senator Jesse Helms (U.S. Cuba Institute Press, 2001). ISBN 978-1884750014.

=== Interviews ===
- Monteith, Stanley. The Fourth Floor: U.S. Government Brought Fidel Castro to Power. Interview with Earl E. T. Smith (Radio Liberty).

== See also ==
- Cuba-United States relations
- History of Cuba

Diplomatic posts
Preceded by Arthur Gardner	United States Ambassador to Cuba; 1957–1959	Succeeded by Philip Bonsal
