= Edward Neufville Tailer =

E. N. Tailer
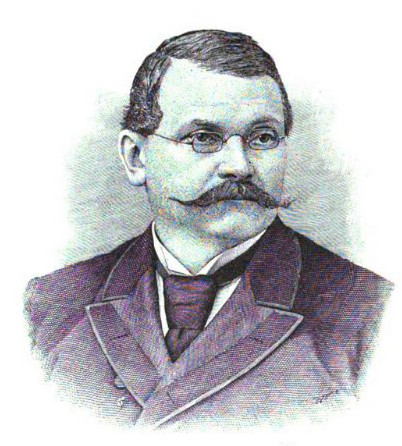
- Born: Edward Neufville Tailer; July 20, 1830; New York City, New York, U.S.
- Died: February 15, 1917 (aged 86); New York City, New York, U.S.
- Spouse: Agnes Suffern (before 1917)
- Parent(s): Edward Neufville Tailer; Ann Amelia Bogert
- Relatives: Earl E. T. Smith (grandson); Robert Reginald Livingston (grandson)

Edward Neufville Tailer (July 20, 1830 – February 15, 1917) who was a New York merchant and banker, and a prominent member of New York Society during the Gilded Age.

== Early life ==
Tailer was born on July 20, 1830, in the Greenwich Village section of New York City. He was the son of New York merchant Edward Neufville Tailer (1797–1873) and Ann Amelia (née Bogert) Tailer (1802–1883). His younger brothers included lawyer Henry Austin Tailer, who was born in 1833, and William Hallett Tailer, who was born in 1842. His father "retired with a fortune in 1837."

His grandfather was Edward Neufville Tailer, Sr. and they were all descendants of Sir William Tailer, a colonial governor of Massachusetts.

Tailer was educated at the well known "Penquest's French school" located on Bank street.

== Career ==
In December 1848, he began his career with the firm of Little, Alden & Co. on Broad Street. In the early part of his career, he was associated with the firms of W. & S. Phipps & Co. of Boston and New York as well as Fanshaw, Milliken & Townsend, Reimer & Meche, and Sturges, Shaw & Co., as a buyer and salesman.

He eventually founded the successful importing and commission house of Winzer & Tailer (later known as E.N. & W.H. Tailer & Co.). The firm was a prominent dry goods merchant, importing cloth company located in New York City. In his travels, he crossed the Atlantic Ocean more than forty times.

He was also a director of several banks, including The German-American Bank and The Northern Dispensary. He retired from business in 1893.

Beginning in 1848, when he was just 18 years old, Tailer kept a daily diary of social matters and other events. Annually, he bound these diaries and kept them in his library. Upon his death, his son Thomas inherited the diaries.

=== Society life ===
Tailer was a member of the controversial "Four Hundred" of New York Society, as dictated by Mrs. Astor and Ward McAllister and published in The New York Times on February 16, 1892. Conveniently, 400 was the number of people that could fit into Mrs. Astor's ballroom. In 1874, he joined the Patriarchs, a group of the city's elite men that was established by McAllister. He succeeded James Alexander Hamilton.

He was a member of the vestry of Ascension Church. He was a member of the Union Club of the City of New York, the Union League Club, the Tuxedo Club, the Country Club, Westchester Polo Club, and Merchants' Clubs and The New England Society and St. Nicholas Society.

== Personal life ==
Tailer was married to Agnes Suffern (1830–1917), the daughter of Thomas Suffern, an Irish immigrant who made a fortune importing Irish linens. They lived in a house at 11 Washington Square North built in 1834 by her father, and traveled extensively around Europe. Together, they were the parents of:

- Agnes Suffern Tailer (1858–1932), who married Henry Lawrence Burnett (1838–1916) in 1882 at the Church of the Ascension.
- Mary Tailer (1863–1944), who married Robert Reginald Livingston (1858–1899) of Northwood, the brother of architect Goodhue Livingston and grandson of Lt. Governor Edward Philip Livingston, in 1884.
- Thomas Suffern Tailer (1866–1928), who married Maude Louise Lorillard (1876–1922), the daughter of Pierre Lorillard IV, in 1893. They divorced, and he married Harriet Stewart Brown (1884–1953), daughter of Baltimore banker Alexander Brown, in 1909. After his death, his widow married C. Ledyard Blair.
- Laura Suffern Tailer (1869–1887), who died young.
- Frances Bogert "Fannie" Tailer (1884–1953), who married Sydney Johnston Smith (1868–1949), a cotton broker and sportsman, in 1896. They divorced in 1909 and she married C. Whitney Carpenter (1884–1954) in 1916. They also divorced.

Tailer died in New York City on February 15, 1917. He was buried in Green-Wood Cemetery in Brooklyn, New York. His wife died shortly thereafter on March 17, 1917, reportedly overcome by grief for the loss of her husband.

=== Descendants ===
Through his daughter Mary, he was a grandfather of Assemblyman Robert Reginald Livingston Jr. Through his daughter Frances, he was a grandfather of Earl Edward Tailer Smith (1903–1991), a diplomat who served as U.S. Ambassador to Cuba as well as the mayor of Palm Beach, Florida.
