= Florence Pritchett =

American fashion editor, journalist, and radio and TV personality

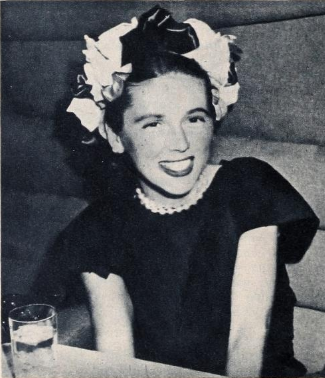
- c. 1945
- Born: June 28, 1920; West Orange, New Jersey, U.S.
- Died: November 9, 1965 (age 45); New York City, U.S.
- Other names: Florence Pritchett Smith
- Occupation(s): Fashion editor, journalist, radio and TV personality
- Spouses: Richard Canning (m. 1940; div. 1943) Earl E. T. Smith (m. 1947)

Florence "Flo" Pritchett, also known as Florence Pritchett Smith (June 28, 1920 – November 9, 1965), was an American fashion editor, journalist, and radio and TV personality.

== Biography ==
Florence Pritchett was born on June 28, 1920, in West Orange, New Jersey. In 1940, she married Richard Canning. They divorced in 1943. In 1944, she met John F. Kennedy. Author Sally Bedell Smith has theorized that Pritchett and Kennedy dated in the 1940s and remained friends until the early 1960s. Pritchett was also romantically linked to actors Robert Walker and Errol Flynn.

Pritchett worked as the fashion editor for New York Journal-American and wrote articles for Photoplay. She appeared as a panelist on the radio and TV program Leave It to the Girls from 1945 to 1953. In 1946, she worked as a special representative for David O. Selznick, helping promote films like Duel in the Sun.

Pritchett married Earl E. T. Smith in 1947. Smith was appointed ambassador to Cuba in 1957. That year, Pritchett established a three-year scholarship for Cuban students to study fashion, textile design, and interior design in the U.S.

Florence Pritchett died on November 9, 1965, in the Manhattan apartment where she lived with her husband and 12-year-old son. She suffered a cerebral hemorrhage after at least several weeks of struggling with leukemia. Her obituaries in the New York Times and New York Journal-American said she had been "in ill health since mid-August" and had been treated for it in what was then called Roosevelt Hospital. Her book, These Entertaining People, was released by Macmillan Publishers in 1966.
