= Trinity Episcopal Church (Potsdam, New York) =

Historic church in New York, United States

- U.S. National Register of Historic Places
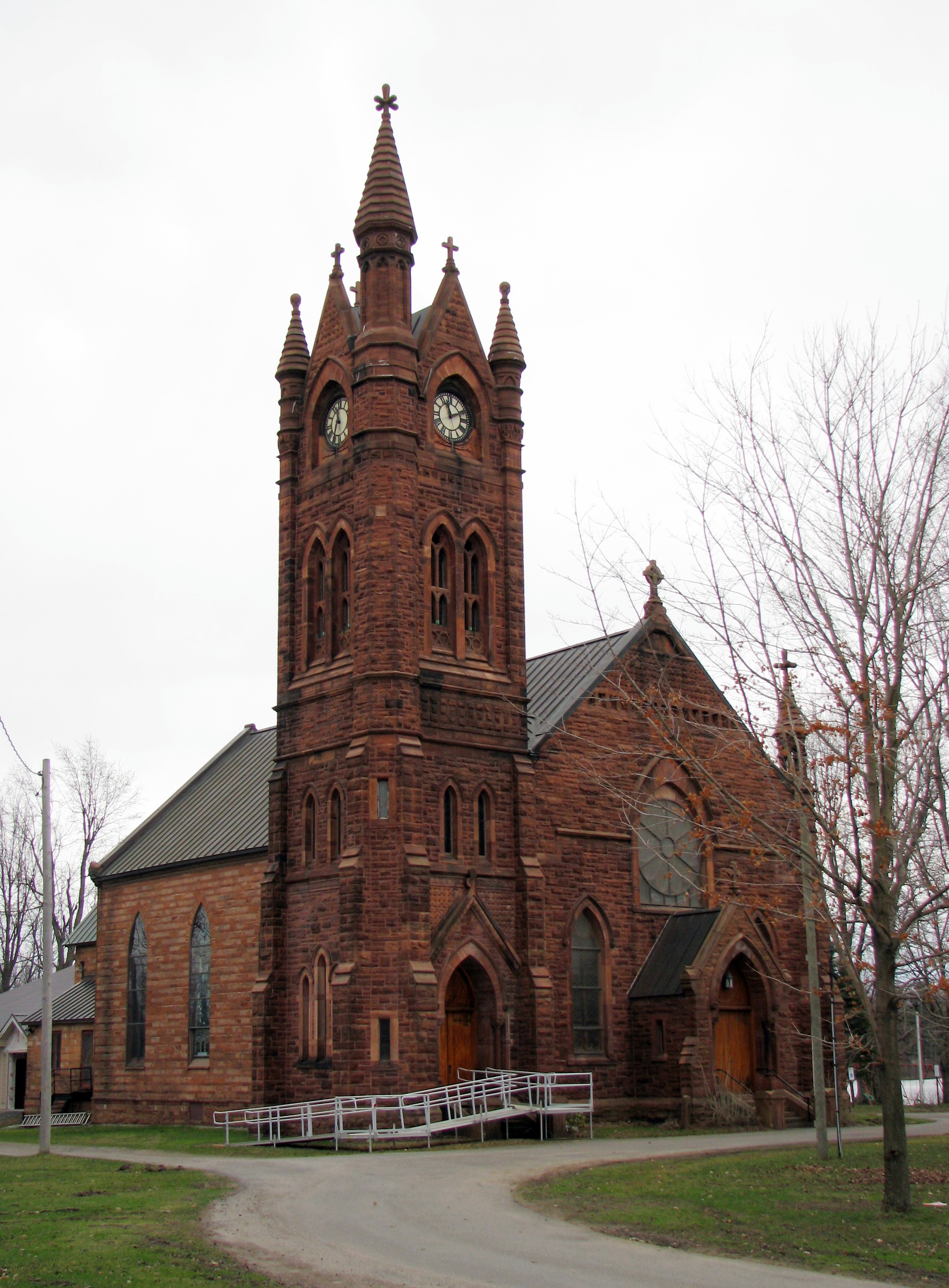
- Trinity Episcopal Church

- Location within New York Location within the United States
- Location: 8 Maple St., Potsdam, New York
- Coordinates: 44°40′2″N 74°59′18″W
- Area: 3.1 acres (1.3 ha)
- Built: 1835
- Architect: multiple
- Architectural style: Federal, Gothic Revival, et al.
- MPS: Red Potsdam Sandstone Resources Taken from Raquette River Quarries MPS
- NRHP reference No.: 03000032
- Added to NRHP: February 13, 2003

Trinity Episcopal Church is a historic Episcopal church located at Potsdam in St. Lawrence County, New York. It was built in 1835 in the Federal style with Gothic elements built of red Potsdam Sandstone. It was greatly enlarged and transformed into High Victorian Gothic style later in the 19th century, with less significant alterations continuing into the 20th century. The front facade of the church took its final form in 1886 and is a lavishly decorated Victorian Gothic creation, made possible by donations from Thomas S. Clarkson and his family. It features a 110-foot-tall (34 m), 19-by-19-foot (5.8 by 5.8 m) four-level tower. Also on the property is a stone wall dating to 1870, a large cast iron urn dating to about 1880 and a cast iron lamppost on a sandstone base dating to 1880.

It was listed on the National Register of Historic Places in 2003.
