= Arthur Gardner (diplomat) =

American diplomat

Arthur Gardner (1889–1967) was a United States foreign diplomat and American ambassador to Cuba from 1953 to 1957. Gardner was a close confidant of President Dwight D. Eisenhower and was also strongly pro-Batista.

Gardner fought in World War I, and worked for the War Production Board during World War II. Following the war Gardner became an assistant to the U.S. Secretary of the Treasury, John W. Snyder. As the ambassador to Cuba, he actively obstructed release of information from the embassy to Washington that was adversely critical to Batista. In the early days of the second Eisenhower administration Gardner was pressured to resign his position as ambassador to Cuba, even though Gardner had gone directly to President Eisenhower to ask to stay on. Pressure also came to bear that Gardner's inability to communicate to the US the terrorist nature of Fidel Castro, blinded him to the perceived atrocities taking place by the 26 of July movement all over the island and the significance of the uprising. Gardner's position came to be viewed as a liability, and his continuing as ambassador was portrayed as an obstacle to improving relations between the countries during a possible transition from Batista to a democratically elected president. On June 16, 1957, Gardner was forced to resign. In his place, Eisenhower named Earl E. T. Smith as Gardner's successor.

Following the Cuban Revolution of 1959, Gardner testified that he felt that Washington had "pulled the rug out" from under Batista. He stated

that he questioned whether Castro merited the support or friendship of the United States. Mr. Gardner, do you have any idea why the United States allowed Castro to get arms from the United States, and would not allow Batista to have arms to preserve his government...you have been quoted as saying that Washington had a pro-Castro bias, "that the State Department was influenced, first, by those stories by (the New York Times') Herbert Matthews, and soon (support for Castro) became kind of a fetish with them?" "

Diplomatic posts
Preceded by Willard L. Beaulac	United States Ambassador to Cuba; 1953–1957	Succeeded by Earl E. T. Smith

== See also ==
- Cuba-United States relations
- History of Cuba
