= David Augustus Clarkson =

Hudson River valley landowner

- Born: September 6, 1793; New York City, New York, U.S.
- Died: November 24, 1850 (aged 57); New York City, New York, U.S.
- Spouse: Margaret Livingston (m. 1827)
- Children: 3
- Parent(s): Thomas Streatfeild Clarkson I Elizabeth Van Horne

David Augustus Clarkson (September 6, 1793 – November 24, 1850) was a Hudson River valley landowner and member of several prominent families.

== Early life ==
Clarkson was born on September 6, 1793, in New York City. He was a son of Thomas Streatfeild Clarkson Sr. (1763–1844) and Elizabeth (née Van Horne) Clarkson (1771–1852).

His paternal grandparents were David Clarkson Jr. and Elizabeth (née French) Clarkson. Through his younger brother Thomas Jr., he was an uncle to Thomas S. Clarkson, the namesake of Clarkson University. His maternal grandparents were Thomas Van Horne and Anna Maria (née Van Cortlandt) Van Horne.

== Career and personal life ==
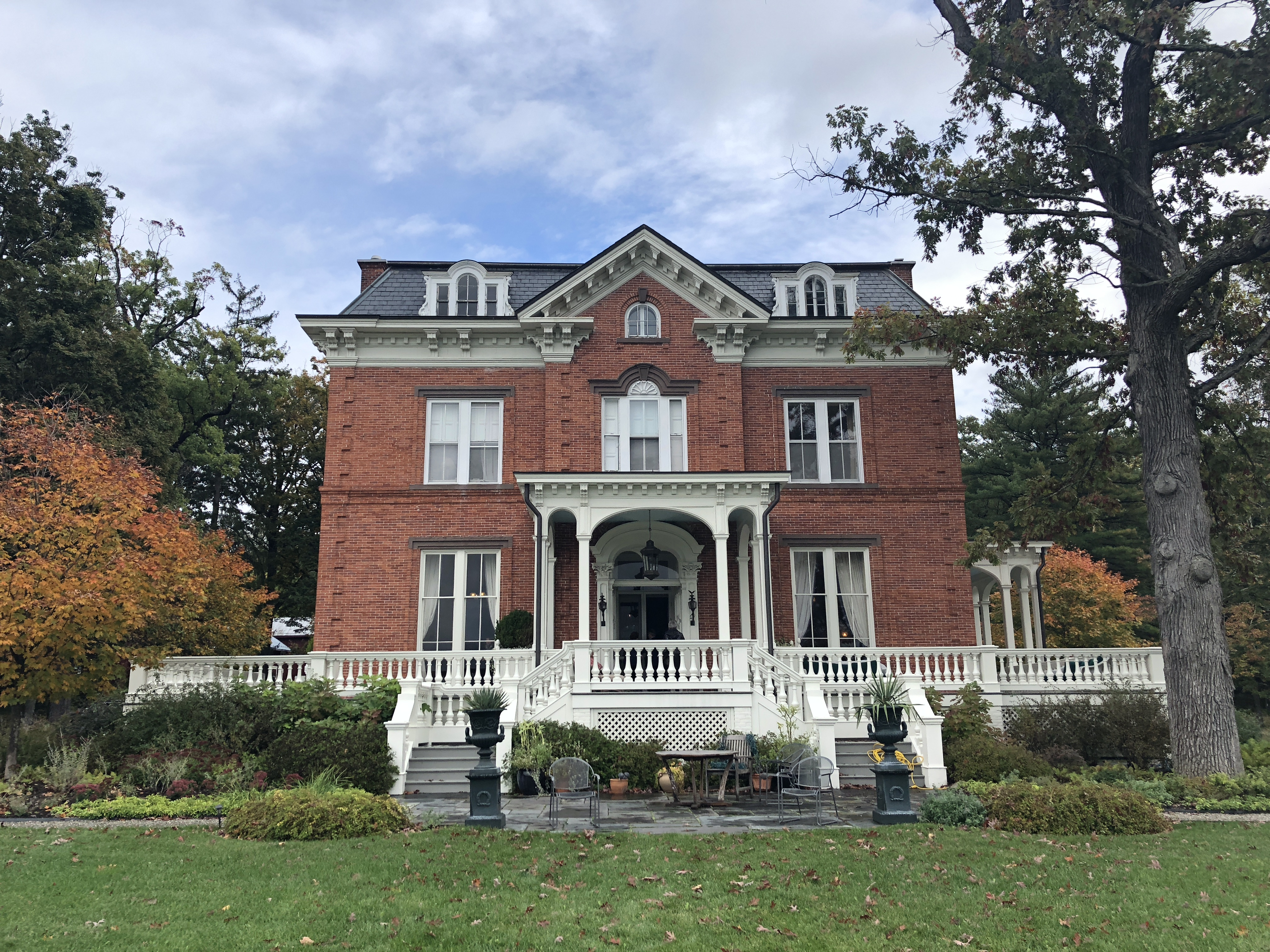
Front of Chiddingstone (facing the Hudson River), 2018.

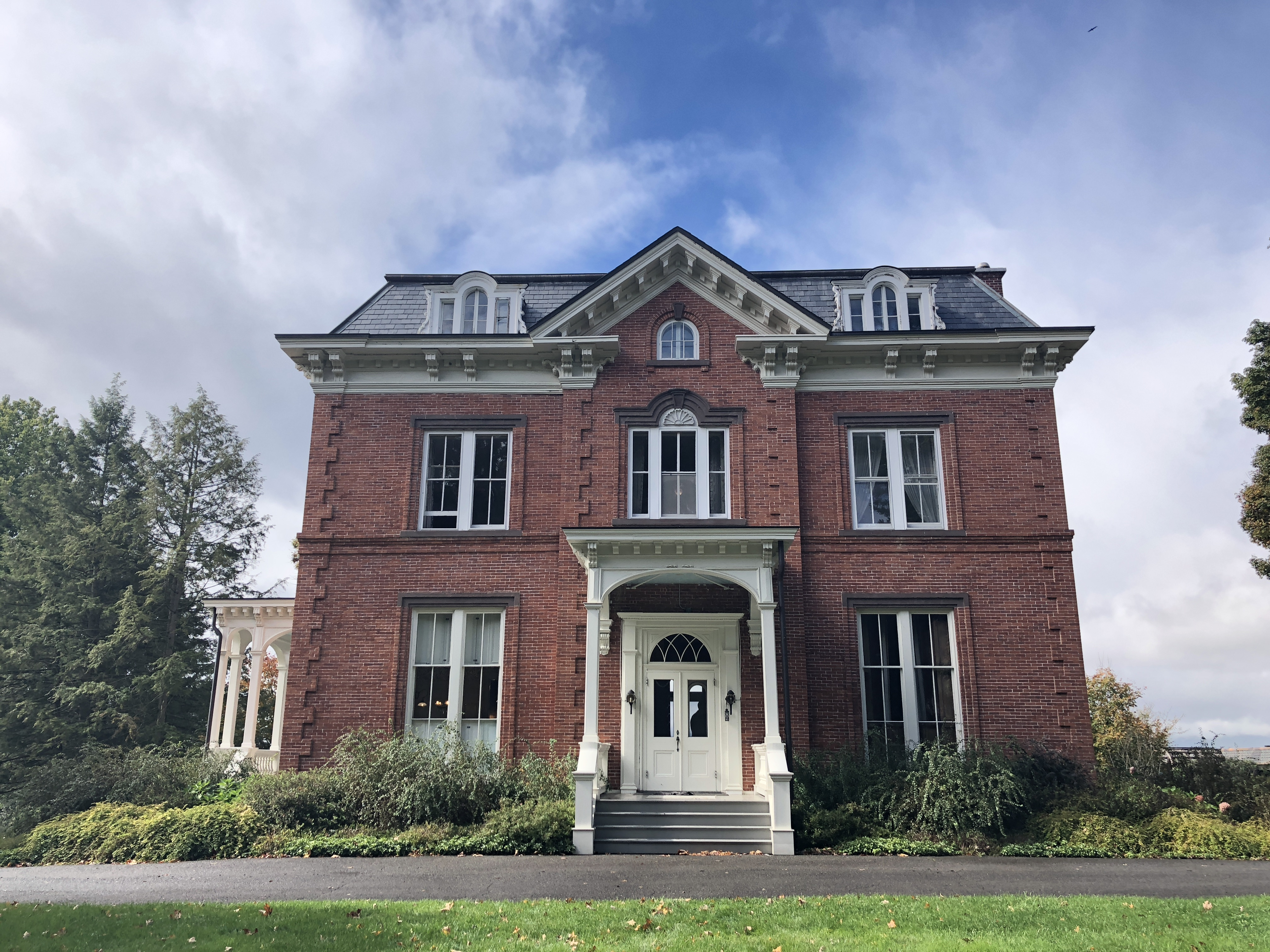
Rear view of Chiddingstone, 2018.

Clarkson was an 1810 graduate in arts of Columbia College.

On October 4, 1827, Clarkson married Elizabeth Livingston (1808–1874) at Clermont, the Livingston family estate on the Hudson River. Margaret was the daughter of Lt. Gov. of New York Edward Philip Livingston and his wife, Elizabeth Stevens Livingston. The Clarkson country estate, a wooden frame home called "Chiddingstone," had a quarter mile front on the Hudson River and was one of the five subdivisions his father-in-law made to his children. Together, they were the parents of:

- Edward Livingston Clarkson (1828–1829), who died in infancy.
- Elizabeth Clarkson (1830–1860), who married George Gibbes Barnwell (1826–1902), grand-nephew of Robert Barnwell, in 1854.
- Thomas Streatfield Clarkson (1834–1898), who was involved in real estate and who married Mary Whitmarsh, daughter of Richmond Whitmarsh and Cornelia (née de Peyster) Whitmarsh.

Clarkson died on November 24, 1850. His wife died in New York City on April 28, 1874. After this death in 1850, his wife divided their Hudson River estate into two, with the north lot (containing Chiddingstone) going to son Thomas, who razed the elder Clarkson's home and, around 1860, constructed a new Italianate and classical brick home in its place, also called Chiddingstone. Their daughter Elizabeth received the southern half. After her death in 1860, the property was sold to William H. Hunt of New Orleans for his wife Elizabeth Ridgely (a great-granddaughter of Chancellor Livingston through his daughter Margaret).

=== Descendants ===
Through his daughter Elizabeth, he was a grandfather of Robert Morgan Gibbes Barnwell (1858–1930), who married Elizabeth Marie (daughter of Albin Marie) in 1883.

Through his son Thomas, he was a grandfather of David Augustus Clarkson (1858–1952), an 1881 Columbia graduate who served as president of the Real Estate Board of Brokers. Clarkson served as a trustee of the New York Dispensary for many years and "once conducted, by order of Gov. Charles Evans Hughes, an investigation into the system of giving title to real estate brokers."
