= Thomas S. Clarkson =

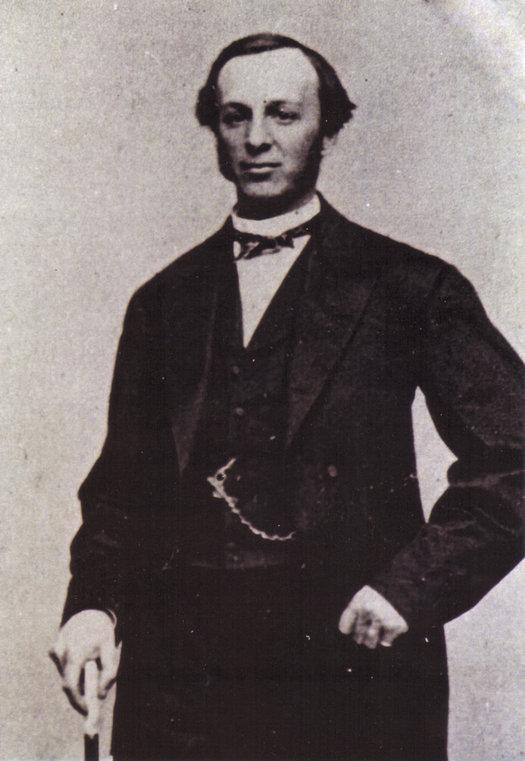
- Born: Thomas Streatfeild Clarkson III; November 30, 1837; New York City, New York, U.S.
- Died: August 19, 1894 (aged 56); Potsdam, New York, U.S.
- Education: St. Lawrence Academy
- Known for: Namesake of Clarkson University
- Parent(s): Thomas Streatfeild Clarkson II; Elizabeth Clarkson

Thomas Streatfeild Clarkson III (November 30, 1837 – August 19, 1894) was an American businessman and philanthropist. Clarkson University was named after him.

== Early life ==
Thomas Streatfeild Clarkson was born in 1837 to Thomas Streatfeild Clarkson II (1799–1873) and Elizabeth Clarkson (1810–1883), who were first cousins. He had one brother, Levinus Clarkson (1835–1876), and three sisters, Elizabeth (1833–1918), Frederica (1846–1909), and Lavinia Clarkson (1842–1926).

His paternal grandparents were Thomas Streatfeild Clarkson (1763–1844) and Elizabeth Van Horne (1771–1852). His uncle, David Augustus Clarkson, was married to the former Margaret Livingston (the daughter of Edward Philip Livingston, the Lt. Governor of New York from 1831 to 1832). His cousins included Elizabeth (née Clarkson) Barnwell and Thomas Streatfeild Clarkson.

He attended the St. Lawrence Academy and then received private tutoring.

== Career ==
The Clarkson family was wealthy from stock investments and real estate holdings, but required all of the sons to learn a trade, so Clarkson and his brother Levinus operated the family's farm until Levinus' death.

At this time, Clarkson engaged in other business endeavors in Potsdam, New York including developing local electrical power plants and the first sewer system in the area and operating large sandstone quarries on the Raquette River in 1877. Clarkson and a cousin founded the Potsdam Public Library and Reading Room and a tuition-free night school teaching mechanical drawing. Clarkson made a large donation to Trinity Episcopal Church in Potsdam in honor of his father.

=== Death ===
Clarkson was accidentally killed while working in his sandstone quarry not far from Potsdam. When a worker was in danger of being crushed by a loose pump, Clarkson pushed him out of the way risking his own life. Clarkson was crushed against a wall by the swinging pump, sustaining severe internal injuries. He died five days later. The Clarkson family realized great wealth in the development of such quarries, and Potsdam sandstone was highly sought after by developers of townhouses in New York City and elsewhere. The family were important benefactors in the Potsdam area.

After his death, Clarkson's three sisters decided to fund a school, which would be named after their brother. The school was founded in 1896 and was called the Thomas S. Clarkson Memorial School of Technology before it later became Clarkson University. Upon his niece, Annie Clarkson's, death in 1929, she made the college her chief beneficiary.
