= Edward Philip Livingston =

American politician

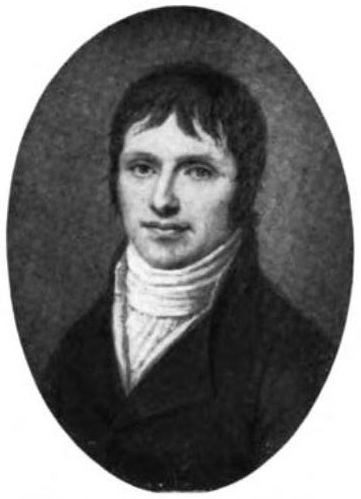

Member of the New York State Senate
- In office January 1, 1838 – October 9, 1839
- Preceded by: Alonzo C. Paige
- Succeeded by: Friend Humphrey

Lieutenant Governor of New York
- In office 1831–1832
- Governor: Enos Thompson Throop
- Preceded by: William M. Oliver
- Succeeded by: John Tracy

Member of the New York State Senate
- In office January 1, 1824 – December 31, 1824
- Preceded by: Vacant
- Succeeded by: Richard McMichael
- In office January 1, 1823 – December 31, 1823
- Preceded by: New district
- Succeeded by: Jacob Haight

Personal details
- Born: November 24, 1779 Kingston, Jamaica
- Died: November 3, 1843 (aged 63) Clermont, New York
- Party: Democratic-Republican; Democratic
- Spouses: Elizabeth Stevens Livingston (m. 1799; died 1829) Mary Crooke Broom (m. 1832)
- Children: 5
- Parent(s): Philip Philip Livingston; Sara Johnson
- Relatives: See Livingston family
- Education: Columbia College

Edward Philip Livingston (November 24, 1779 – November 3, 1843) was an American politician.

== Early life ==
He was the son of Philip Philip Livingston (1741–1787, son of Philip Livingston) and Sara (Johnson) Livingston (ca. 1749–1802). He was a grandnephew of William Livingston, Governor of New Jersey; grandson of Philip Livingston, a signer of the Declaration of Independence; first cousin once removed of Walter Livingston, Speaker of the New York State Assembly; first cousin once removed and nephew by marriage of Edward Livingston, Secretary of State; and second cousin of Henry Walter Livingston, a United States representative from New York.

Livingston was a 1796 graduate of Columbia College.

== Career ==
After his father-in-law's death, Edward P. Livingston became the master of Clermont Manor. He resided at Clermont Manor from 1802 until the time of his death. Livingston was a member of the Board of Regents of the University of the State of New York from 1827 to 1831.

He served as a Lieutenant Colonel in the militia, was aide-de-camp to Governor Dewitt Clinton, and served as Judge of the Columbia County Court of Common Pleas.

He was aide to Governor Daniel D. Tompkins, and private secretary to his father-in-law Robert R. Livingston (1746–1813), then US Minister to France.

=== New York State Senate ===
Edward P. Livingston was a member of the New York State Senate (Middle D.) from 1808 to 1812, and lost his seat to Martin Van Buren. He was a presidential elector in 1820, voting for James Monroe and Daniel D. Tompkins; and again a member of the State Senate (3rd D.) in 1823 and 1824.

=== Lieutenant Governor of New York ===
He was proposed in 1830 for Governor of New York, but his candidacy was questioned by some opponents in the Democratic-Republican Party on the grounds that he had been born on the island of Jamaica. As a naturalized citizen of New York, Livingston was eligible to run, but his foreign birth was used to prevent his nomination. Instead Enos T. Throop, who had succeeded to the governorship when Martin Van Buren became United States Secretary of State, was nominated for a full term as governor, and Livingston was nominated for lieutenant governor. Throop and Livingston won, and Livingston served from 1831 to 1832. He was again a presidential elector in 1832.

=== Return to NY Senate ===
He was again a member of the State Senate (3rd D.) in 1838 and 1839. He resigned his seat on October 9, 1839.

== Personal life ==
On November 20, 1799, he married Elizabeth Stevens Livingston (1780–1829), the eldest daughter of Chancellor Robert R. Livingston. Their children included:

- Margaret Livingston (1808–1874), who married David Augustus Clarkson (1793–1874)
- Elizabeth Livingston (1813–1896), who married Edward Hunter Ludlow (1810–1884)
- Clermont Livingston (1817–1895), who married Cornelia Livingston (1824–1851), daughter of Herman Livingston (brother of Robert Le Roy Livingston).
- Robert Edward Livingston (1820–1889), who married Susan Maria Clarkson de Peyster (1823–1910), sister of Frederic James de Peyster.
- Mary Livingson (1823–1898), who married Levinus Clarkson (1813–1861), a first cousin of David A. Clarkson, in 1849.

After the death of his wife in 1829, and while he was Lt. Governor of New York, Livingston happened to look in the gallery of the Senate Chamber in Albany, where he saw Mary Crooke Broom (1804–1877) seated, and was struck by her beauty. She was "reckoned the most beautiful girl in all this region." They married in 1832. She was the eldest child and daughter of William Broom and Ann Crooke Barber.

Livingston died in Clermont on November 3, 1843. He was buried at Poughkeepsie Rural Cemetery in Poughkeepsie, New York. Upon his death, he left Clermont Manor to his son Clermont. After his death, his second wife remarried to Judge Charles Herman Ruggles.

=== Descendants ===
Through his eldest daughter, Margaret, Livingston was the grandfather of Thomas Streatfeild Clarkson (1837–1894), namesake of Clarkson University.

Through his second daughter, Elizabeth, he was the grandfather of Mary Livingston Ludlow (1843–1919), who was the mother of Anna (née Hall) Roosevelt (1863–1892) and grandmother of First Lady Eleanor Roosevelt (1884–1962), Livingston's great-great-granddaughter who married her distant cousin, Franklin D. Roosevelt.

Through his elder son, Clermont, he was the grandfather of John Henry Livingston (1848–1927), who married Catherine Livingston Hamersley (d. 1873) the sister of J. Hooker Hamersley and the daughter of John W. and Catherine Livingston (née Hooker) Hamersley and granddaughter of Hon. James Hooker, in 1871, with whom he had one child. After her death, he married Emily Evans, the daughter of William E. Evans and niece of Mrs. Gouverneur Ogden, in 1880. Also through his son Clermont, he was the grandfather of Mary Livingston (d. 1876), who married Col. Frederic de Peyster (1843–1874), a son of Maj. Gen. John Watts de Peyster (1821–1907), in 1874, with whom he had two children.

Through his younger son, Robert, he was the grandfather of Catharine Goodhue Livingston (1856–1931), Robert Robert Livingston (1858–1899), who married Mary Tailer (1863–1944) Edward De Peyster Livingston (1861–1932), and Goodhue Livingston (1867–1951), who married Louisa Robb (1877–1960).

New York State Senate
Preceded by new district	New York State Senate; Third District (Class 1); 1823	Succeeded by Jacob Haight
Preceded by vacant	New York State Senate; Third District (Class 2); 1824	Succeeded by Richard McMichael
Political offices
Preceded by William M. Oliver; Acting	Lieutenant Governor of New York; 1831–1832	Succeeded by John Tracy
New York State Senate
Preceded by Alonzo C. Paige	New York State Senate; Third District (Class 3); 1838–1839	Succeeded by Friend Humphrey
