= Henry Lawrence Burnett =

American lawyer

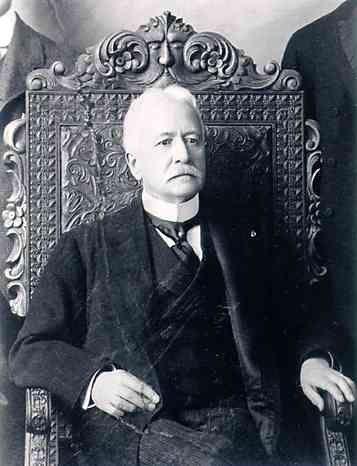

U.S. Attorney for the Southern District of New York
- In office January 1898 – January 1906
- President: William McKinley; Theodore Roosevelt
- Preceded by: Wallace Macfarlane
- Succeeded by: Henry L. Stimson

Personal details
- Born: December 26, 1838 Youngstown, Ohio, U.S.
- Died: January 4, 1916 (aged 77) New York City, New York, U.S.
- Resting place: Slate Hill Cemetery; Goshen, New York
- Spouses: Grace Hoffman (m. 1858; died 1864) Sarah Gibson Lansing (m. 1867; died 1877) Agnes Suffern Tailer (m. 1882)
- Education: Chester Academy; Hiram Academy
- Alma mater: Ohio State National Law School

Military service
- Allegiance: United States of America; Union
- Branch/service: United States Army; Union Army
- Years of service: 1861–1865
- Rank: Major; Brevet Brigadier General
- Battles/wars: American Civil War; Battle of Carthage; Battle of Old Fort Wayne; Knoxville campaign

Henry Lawrence Burnett (December 26, 1838 – January 4, 1916) was an American lawyer and, after serving as a major in the Cavalry Corps (Union Army), he was a colonel and Judge Advocate in the Union Army during the American Civil War. He was a prosecutor in the trial that followed the assassination of Abraham Lincoln. He was appointed to the grade of brevet brigadier general of volunteers in 1866, to rank from March 13, 1865.

== Early life ==
Burnett was born in Youngstown, Ohio, in 1838. He was the son of Henry Burnett (1801–1876), an abolitionist, and Nancy (née Jones) Burnett (d. 1880). His paternal grandfather, Samuel Burnett, a native of Morristown, New Jersey, was well educated and at one time was prominent and influential. He had a considerable fortune, but lost most of his property during the Revolutionary War, along with Robert Morris, and emigrated west to Ohio around 1798. He was also a descendant of William Burnett, a colonial governor of New York and New Jersey.

Determined not to become a farmer, he ran away from home to get an education. He attended Chester Academy and, later, Hiram College where he was taught by later President James A. Garfield.

In 1855, he began his studies at Ohio State National Law School, in Poland, Ohio, graduating in 1859. Following his graduation, he began reading law with Judge Benjamin F. Hoffman, law partner of David Tod, who later served as Governor of Ohio. He was admitted to the bar in 1860, and began practicing in Warren, Ohio.

== Career ==
In 1861 when the Civil War broke out, Burnett joined the 2nd Ohio Cavalry, where he rose to the rank of major in 1862. In this capacity he commanded 400 cavalry soldiers during an operation into the Oklahoma Territory, and defended the actions of a colonel who placed General James Blunt under arrest. After being trampled by a horse and seriously injured in 1863, however, he transferred to the Judge Advocate General's Corps of the Department of the Ohio, working for Joseph Holt, the Judge Advocate General of the U.S. Army.

In 1865, he was appointed brevet colonel in the Judge Advocate Corps.

=== Lincoln assassination trial ===
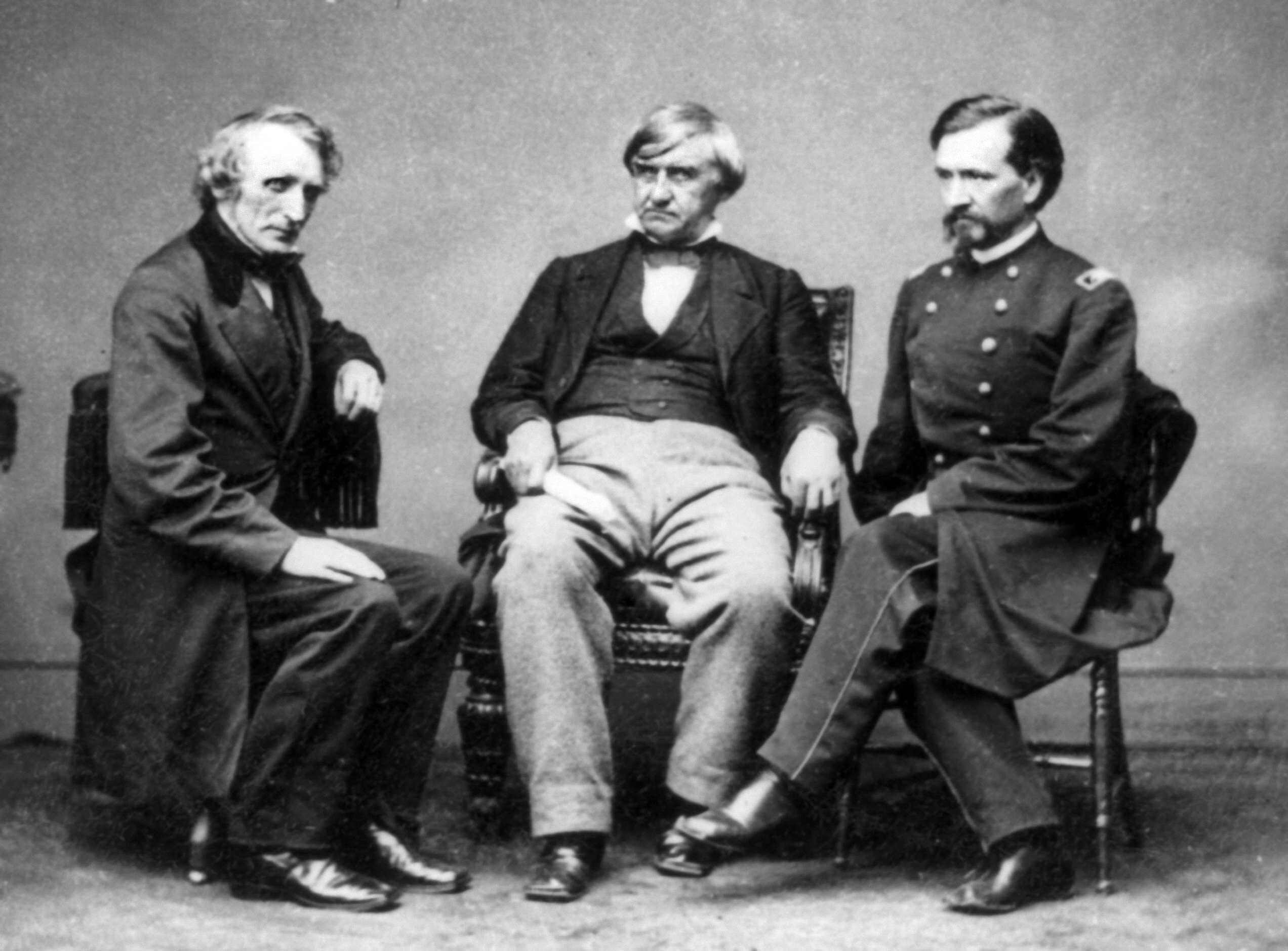
Henry Burnett (right) along with John Bingham (left) and Joseph Holt (center) were the three judges in charge of the Lincoln assassination trial.

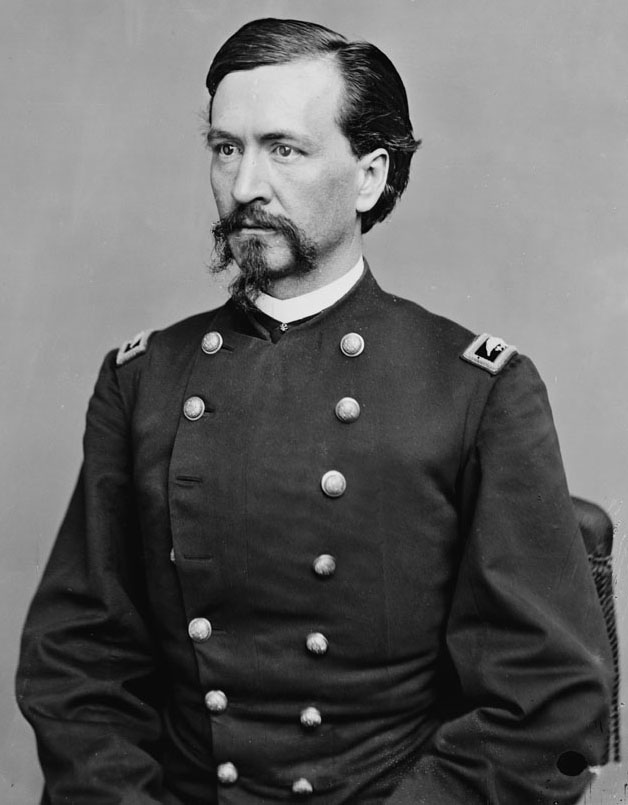
Brig. Gen. Henry Lawrence Burnett

After the assassination of President Abraham Lincoln in 1865, Burnett was called upon by Secretary of War Edwin Stanton to be an Assistant Judge Advocate General. Along with him were John Bingham and Joseph Holt, the Judge Advocate General. The accused conspirators where George Atzerodt, David Herold, Lewis Powell, Samuel Arnold, Michael O'Laughlen, Edman Spangler, Samuel Mudd and Mary Surratt.

The trial began on May 10, 1865. The three spent nearly two months in court, awaiting a verdict from the jury. Holt and Bingham attempted to obscure the fact that there were two plots. The first plot was to kidnap Lincoln in exchange for the Confederate prisoners the Union had. The second was to assassinate Lincoln, Vice President Andrew Johnson and Secretary of State William H. Seward to throw the government into chaos.

It was important for the prosecution not to reveal the existence of a diary taken from the body of Lincoln's assassin John Wilkes Booth. The diary made it clear that the assassination plan dated from April 14. The defence surprisingly did not call for Booth's diary to be produced in court. Holt was accused of withholding evidence, but it was never proven.

On June 29, the eight were found guilty for their involvement in the conspiracy to kill Lincoln. Arnold, O'Laughlen and Mudd were sentenced to life in prison, Spangler six years in prison and Atzerodt, Herold, Paine and Surratt were to hang. They were executed July 7, 1865. Surratt was the first woman in American history to be executed. O'Laughlen died in prison in 1867. Arnold, Spangler, and Mudd were pardoned by Andrew Johnson in early 1869.

Following the completion of the trial, in October 1865, Burnett asked to be mustered out on December 1, 1865, which was granted. Senator John Sherman and Holt asked for him to be appointed a brevet brigadier general, which he accepted in May 1866. On January 13, 1866, President Andrew Johnson nominated Burnett for appointment to the grade of brevet brigadier general of volunteers, to rank from March 13, 1865, and the United States Senate confirmed the appointment on March 12, 1866.

=== Post-Civil War career ===
In late 1865, he moved to New York City, where he resumed the practice of law with Judge Thomas W. Bartley, former Justice of the Ohio Supreme Court and governor of Ohio, until 1869. Following his practice in New York, Burnett and his second wife moved back to Ohio, where he then practiced law with Jacob Dolson Cox, another former governor, and John F. Follett, who later served as a U.S. Representative, until 1872, when he started a practice in New York with Edwin W. Stoughton.

Burnett again moved to New York, this time in Buffalo, where he served as counsel to the Buffalo and Erie Railroad (where his father-in-law was treasurer), until 1874. After the railroad, he formed several law practices in New York with various prominent men, including Emott, Burnett & Hammond (with former judge James Emott, Henry B. Hammond, and Charles C. Emott in 1875), which litigated for and against the Railways, Emott, Burnett & Kidder (with Camillus George Kidder in 1877), Bristow, Peet, Burnett, & Opdyke (with Benjamin Bristow, a former Secretary of the Treasury, William Peet, and W. S. Opdyke in 1878), and Burnett & Whitney (with Edward Baldwin Whitney in 1883). He was notably involved in representing the English bondholders in the Emma Silver Mine litigation.

In 1898, President William McKinley, his close friend, appointed Burnett federal district attorney for the southern district of New York. Upon completion of his four-year term, he was reappointed by McKinley's successor, Theodore Roosevelt, for another four-year term in 1901, which he served in until his retirement in 1906.

== Personal life ==
On October 27, 1858, Burnett married Grace "Kitty" Hoffman (1842–1864), the daughter of Benjamin F. Hoffman, a judge. Together, they were the parents of:

- Grace Hoffman Burnett (1860–1945), who married Baron Victor Siegmund von Oertzen (1854–1934), a Maj. Gen. in the Imperial German army, in 1878.(His sister, Baroness Felicioas von Oertzen was married to William H. Barber in 1890.) She died, childless, in Bad Doberan.
- Catharine "Kitty" Cleveland Burnett (b. 1864),

After his first wife's death in 1864, he married Sarah Gibson Lansing (1846–1877), the daughter of Brig. Gen. Henry Livingston Lansing (1818–1889), treasurer of the Buffalo and Erie Railroad, and Catharine Olivia (née Gibson) Lansing (1818–1897), on September 4, 1867. Her paternal grandfather was Barent Bleecker Lansing and her maternal grandparents were Henry Bicker Gibson (1783–1863), banker and president of the Rochester and Syracuse Railroad, and one of the richest men in Western New York, and Sarah (née Sherman) Gibson (herself the aunt of William Watts Sherman). Before her death in 1877, they were the parents of:

- Catherine Olivia Gibson Burnett (1873–1934), who married Robert Jewett Mercur (1854–1929) in 1895. They divorced and she married John Evans Bell (1864–1952). Her last marriage was to Robert Meade Van Deusen.
- Lansing Burnett (1869–1893), who died unmarried.

After his second wife's death and burial at Forest Lawn Cemetery in Buffalo in 1877, he married for the third and final time to Agnes Suffern Tailer (1858–1932) on January 31, 1882, at the Church of the Ascension at Fifth Avenue and 10th Street in Manhattan. She was the daughter of Edward Neufville Tailer, a prominent New York merchant and banker, and the granddaughter of Thomas Suffern and Edward Neufville Tailer Sr. (descendants of William Tailer, colonial governor of Massachusetts). The guests at their wedding included Mr. and Mrs. William H. Vanderbilt, William and Alva Vanderbilt, Cornelius and Alice Claypoole Vanderbilt, William Seward and Eliza Vanderbilt Webb, Gen. James Watson Webb, Ogden and Mary Wilson Goelet, Col. and Mrs. Delancey Kane, and others. Together, they were the parents of:

- Henry Lawrence Burnett Jr. (1882–1918), a Columbia University graduate who served as a U.S. Marine aboard the USS Connecticut and died after a fall down the stairs at his home.
- Edward Neufville Tailer Burnett (1885–1966), a Yale University graduate who moved to Coachella, California.
- Robert Suffern Tailer Burnett (1895–1895), who died young.

He died on January 4, 1916, at his home, 7 East 12th Street, in New York City. He had been ill for the previous year with pneumonia, traveling between his city home and country home. After a large funeral, he was interred in Slate Hill Cemetery in Goshen.

=== Society life ===
In 1892, both Burnett and his wife Agnes were included in Ward McAllister's "Four Hundred", purported to be an index of New York's best families, published in The New York Times. Conveniently, 400 was the number of people that could fit into Mrs. Astor's ballroom.

He was a member of the Metropolitan Club, the Century Association, Union Club, the Colonial Club, and the Goshen Driving Club. He also served as past president of the Ohio Society of New York, for four years, and the Loyal Legion.

Seeking a country home away from the city, Burnett and his wife purchased a horse-breeding farm in Goshen, New York, known as "Hillside Farm," where he raced his stock on the amateur circuit. The 193-acre estate was sold in 1917.

== Published works ==
- Some Incidents in the Trial of President Lincoln's Assassins (1888)
- Hancock's Relation to the Trial and Execution of Mrs. Surratt (1888)
- The Controversy between President Johnson and Judge Holt (1889)

== See also ==
- List of American Civil War brevet generals (Union)
