= Lamont O. Repollet =

American educator and administrator (born 1971)

18th President of Kean University
- Incumbent
- Assumed office July 1, 2020
- Preceded by: Dawood Farahi

Commissioner of Education of New Jersey
- In office 2018–2020
- Governor: Phil Murphy

Superintendent of the Asbury Park School District
- In office 2014–2018

Personal details
- Born: 1971 (age 54–55) Carteret, New Jersey, U.S.
- Education: Trenton State College (BA); Kean University (MA); Nova Southeastern University (EdD)
- Occupation: Educator, academic administrator

Lamont O. Repollet (born 1971) is an American educator and academic administrator who currently serves as the 18th president of Kean University. He is a former Commissioner of Education of New Jersey (2018–2020) and previously was superintendent of the Asbury Park School District. Repollet was the first Black person to hold the post of New Jersey education commissioner and is the first Black president in Kean University’s history.

Repollet is a member of Sigma Pi Phi fraternity and Phi Beta Sigma fraternity. He served on the Kean Board of Trustees from 2011 until 2018, serving as secretary and chair of the Academic Policy and Programs Committee. As president, Dr. Repollet presides over a unique academic partnership in China, Wenzhou-Kean University, that delivers an American-style education to more than 5,000 international students on a full-scale campus in Wenzhou, China.

== Early life and education ==
Repollet was born and raised in Carteret, New Jersey, where he attended Carteret High School. Through New Jersey’s Educational Opportunity Fund program, he attended Trenton State College (now The College of New Jersey), where he earned a Bachelor of Arts degree in communication in 1994. He went on to obtain a Master of Arts in educational administration from Kean University in 2000 and later received a Doctor of Education (Ed.D.) in educational leadership from Nova Southeastern University.

== Career ==
Repollet began his career in education as a mathematics teacher and coach in the East Orange School District in New Jersey. He later became principal of Carteret High School, serving in that role for nine years. In 2014, he was appointed superintendent of the Asbury Park School District, a position he held until 2018. In January 2018, Governor Phil Murphy announced Repollet as his nominee for New Jersey Commissioner of Education. Repollet assumed office later that year and served as the state’s education commissioner until 2020. As commissioner, he oversaw initiatives to expand access to early childhood education, promote social and emotional learning in schools, and worked to phase out the PARCC standardized testing program in favor of new assessments. In 2020, when the COVID-19 pandemic forced school closures, Repollet led New Jersey’s public schools through the rapid transition to remote instruction. During his tenure, New Jersey’s school system was ranked first in the nation in Education Week's 2019 "Quality Counts" report.

In May 2020, Repollet was unanimously appointed by Kean University’s Board of Trustees as the university’s president, becoming the first Black leader of the university. He succeeded longtime president Dawood Farahi and officially took office on July 1, 2020. During his tenure, he established several new units at Kean, such as the Divisions of Student Success and Retention, Entrepreneurial Education Initiatives (EEI) and an Office of Governmental Affairs, and he created initiatives like the “Equity in Action” Presidential Postdoctoral Fellowship and a President’s Advisory Council to support student achievement, faculty diversity, and community engagement. In 2021, Kean was designated as New Jersey’s first urban research university. In February 2025, Kean University earned R2 research university status under the Carnegie Classification of Institutions of Higher Education, placing Kean among the top eight percent of colleges and universities nationwide for research and doctorate production.

== Books ==
- Repollet, Lamont O.; Landa, Robin (2026). Leadership by Design: Winning Hearts, Building Your Brand, and Achieving Success.

== Awards and recognition ==
Repollet has received numerous awards for his administrative work. These include the Human Rights Institute's Outstanding Human Rights Educator award (2018) and the Medal of Excellence for Distinguished Service from Rowan University (2019). In 2022, he received the Whitney M. Young Jr. Service Award from both the Urban League of Union County and the Greater New York Councils of the Boy Scouts of America, as well as the EdgeCon Leadership and Vision Award. In 2023, he was the recipient of the Alumni Citation Award from The College of New Jersey and the Chester Holmes Humanitarian Award from the Union County Board of Commissioners.
