= Kalamazoo Institute of Arts =

Non-profit art museum and school in Kalamazoo, Michigan

Coordinates: 42.28942°N 85.58788°W

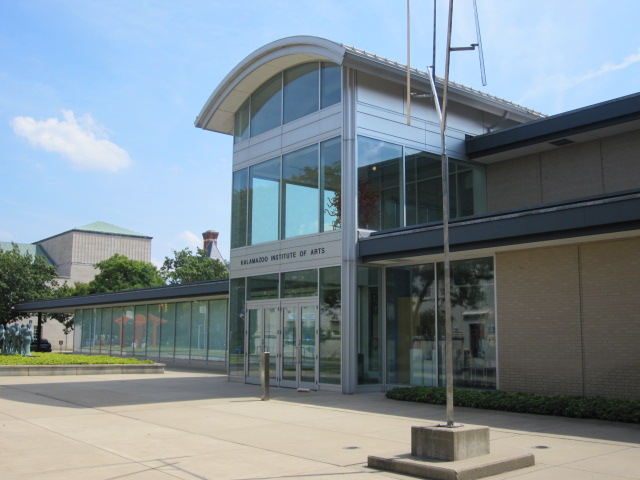
- Established: 1924
- Location: 314 South Park Street, Kalamazoo, Michigan; US
- Director: Michelle Hargrave
- Website: kiarts.org

The Kalamazoo Institute of Arts (KIA) is a non-profit art museum and school in downtown Kalamazoo, Michigan, United States.

== History ==
In 1924, members of the Kalamazoo Chapter of the American Federation of Arts established an art center "to further the development of interest and education in and of regard and appreciation for the various arts."

The Kalamazoo Institute of Arts current building was unveiled in September 1961. Designed by the Chicago, Illinois, firm of Skidmore, Owings & Merrill, the 45,000 square feet (4,200 m^{2}) structure is based on a Mies van der Rohe design for a small museum, in the International Style of architecture.

In 1997, the KIA began a $14.5 million expansion and renovation. The project increased the size of the KIA to 72,000 square feet (6,700 m^{2}), and added a two-story lobby gallery, auditorium, classrooms and galleries, gallery shop, library and an interactive gallery for children.

Dale Chihuly's Kalamazoo Ruby Light Chandelier, a colorful chandelier of 400 pieces of glass, became a permanent fixture in the lobby foyer. The renovated facility, with its 10 galleries and 11,000 square feet (1,000 m^{2}) of exhibition space, opened in September 1998.

== Exhibitions ==
The KIA hosts 10 to 15 temporary exhibitions each year in its ten galleries. These include recurring shows such as the West Michigan Area Show, High School Area Show, and Young Artists of Kalamazoo County. Others are built around works lent from museums, galleries, corporations or private collections.

The museum also mounts ticketed exhibitions; the most successful have drawn tens of thousands of visitors.

- In 2004, 47,000 visitors came to see "Millet To Matisse: Nineteenth- and Twentieth-Century French Painting", an exhibition of Impressionist and post-Impressionist paintings from Kelvingrove Art Gallery and Museum in Glasgow.
- In 2005, nearly 60,000 people came from all 50 states and 17 countries to see "Chihuly in Kalamazoo", an exhibition of works by glass artist Dale Chihuly.
- In 2007, the KIA hosted "Lorna Simpson," a touring exhibition of the work of this contemporary artist.
- In 2008, the KIA curated an exhibition celebrating the resurgence of American figurative painting: "The Figure Revealed."
- In 2008–09, the KIA hosted two large-scale, ticketed exhibitions: "Spared from the Storm: Masterworks from the New Orleans Museum of Art" (November–February) and "Georgia O'Keeffe and Her Times: American Modernism" from the Lane Collection of the Museum of Fine Arts, Boston (May–September).
- In 2015, the KIA hosted exhibitions by Seungmo Park, Manierre Dawson, and curated an exhibition about an artist who helped found the KIA: "Rediscovering Nina Belle Ward."
- In 2016, the KIA hosted solo exhibitions by Barbara Takenaga, Renee Stout, Chul Hyun Ahn, Jiha Moon, and Fred Wessel, all of whom visited Kalamazoo during the course of their exhibitions. The KIA also presented in "Suspended: Sculpture from ArtPrize 2015" emerging artists Joel S. Allen, (Steamboat Springs, Colorado), Russell Prather (Marquette, Michigan), Irene LaVon Walker (Ferndale, Michigan).
- in 2017, the KIA hosted solo exhibitions by Kay Walkingstick, Sayaka Ganz, Hung Liu, and Wadada Leo Smith.
- In 2018, the KIA hosted an exhibition featuring photographer Dawoud Bey.
- In 2019, the KIA hosted the touring exhibition "Black Refractions: Highlights from The Studio Museum in Harlem" and solo shows by contemporary artists Orna Ben-Ami, Inka Essenhigh, Maya Freelon, and Sungyhun Moon.

The KIA offers lectures and educational events, outreach programs and a fine arts research library.

== Permanent collection ==
The museum's permanent collection consists of more than 4,600 original works. Its primary emphasis is on 20th-century American art, with works by such artists as Ansel Adams, Mary Cassatt, Alexander Calder, Chuck Close, Helen Frankenthaler, Edward Hopper, Luis Jiménez, Käthe Kollwitz, Tim Lowly, Ed Paschke, Norman Rockwell, Cindy Sherman, Lorna Simpson, Henri Toulouse-Lautrec, Andy Warhol, James Abbott McNeill Whistler and Andrew Wyeth. The collection also includes a number of 18th- and 19th-century American works, 20th-century European works, as well as African, Chinese, Japanese, and pre-Columbian and Oceanic works.

== Kirk Newman Art School ==
The school has offered visual arts instruction to the community since 1931. Its goal is to nurture artistic creativity in the residents of West Michigan by providing affordable classes and workshops for people of all ages and skill levels in a range of media, including painting and drawing, printmaking, sculpture, ceramics, photography, jewelry-making, weaving and fiber arts. Faculty members are practicing artists and educators. The school was renamed in 2006 to honor Kalamazoo artist and former school director Kirk Newman.

== KIA Art Fair ==
The KIA Art Fair began in 1952 as the Clothesline Art Show, an opportunity for local and regional artists to sell their works. Held the first Saturday of June in nearby Bronson Park, the KIA Art Fair is now the second oldest continuously running art fair in the United States. Each year, thousands of visitors join 200 artists in Bronson Park to view and purchase paintings, prints, drawings, photographs, jewelry, ceramics, fiber ware, sculpture and more.
