= 2009 New Jersey gubernatorial election =

- November 3, 2009
- Turnout: 46.9% (▼2.1)
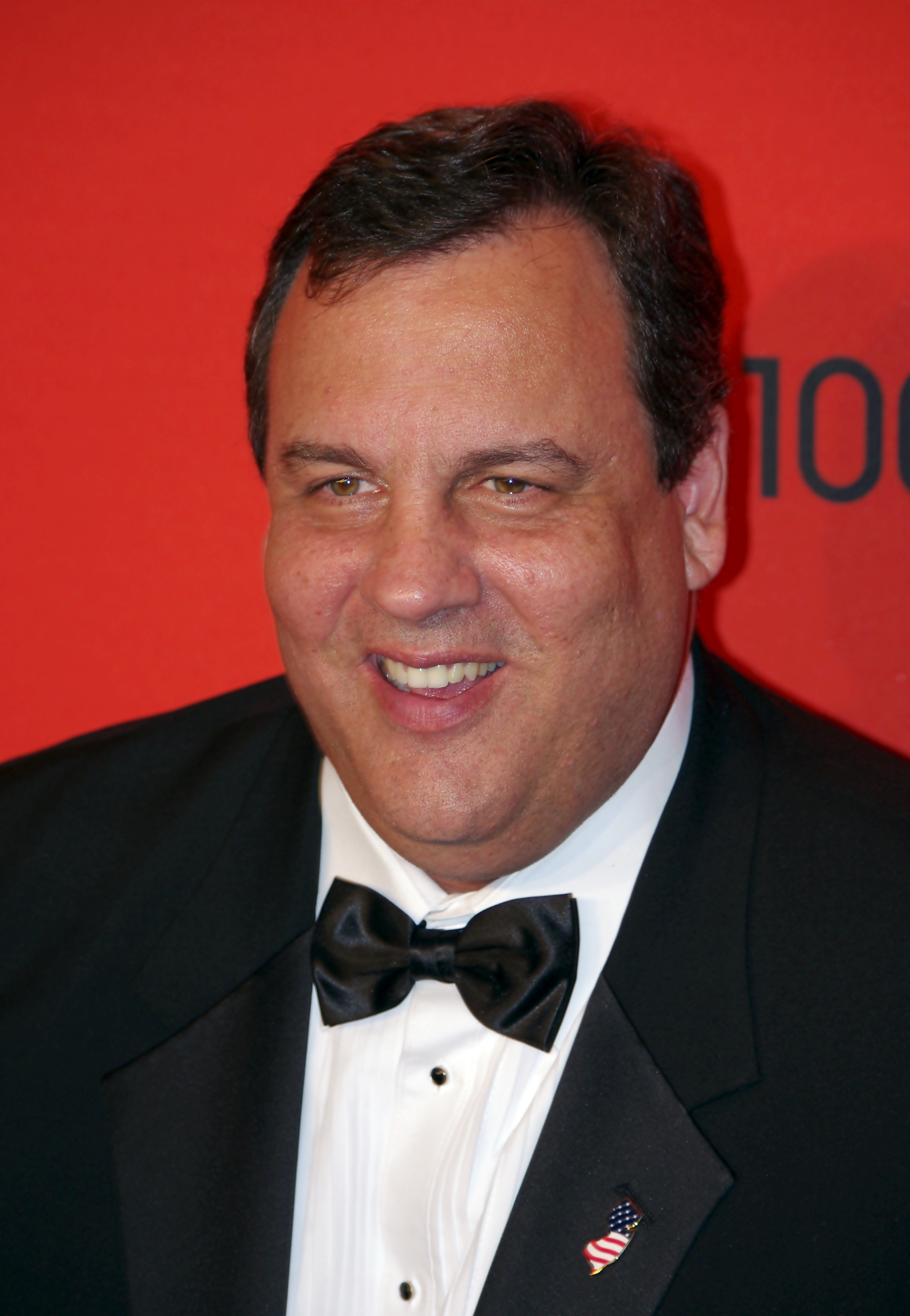

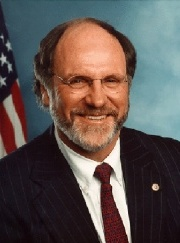

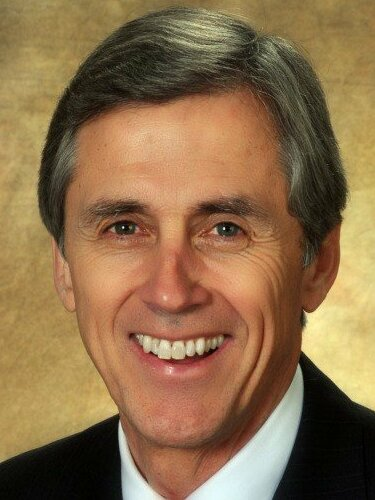
Nominee	Chris Christie	Jon Corzine	Chris Daggett
Party	Republican	Democratic	Independent
Running mate	Kim Guadagno	Loretta Weinberg	Frank Esposito
Popular vote	1,174,445	1,087,731	139,579
Percentage	48.46%	44.88%	5.76%
- Christie: 40–50% 50–60% 60–70% 70–80% 80–90% >90% Corzine: 40–50% 50–60% 60–70% 70–80% 80–90% >90% Tie: 40–50%
Governor before election
Jon Corzine
Democratic
Elected Governor
Chris Christie
Republican

The 2009 New Jersey gubernatorial election took place on November 3, 2009. Incumbent Democratic Governor Jon Corzine ran for a second term against Republican Chris Christie, independent Christopher Daggett, and nine others, in addition to several write-in candidates. Christie won the election, with about 48.5 percent of the vote, to 44.9 percent for Corzine and 5.8 percent for Daggett. He assumed office on January 19, 2010. This was the first election to fill the newly created office of lieutenant governor, with the candidates for governor choosing their running mates. Kim Guadagno, Christie's running mate, became New Jersey's first lieutenant governor.

Christie won the largest margin for a non-incumbent Republican since 1969. He was the first Republican to carry Middlesex and Gloucester counties in a gubernatorial election since 1985. The 2009 election was the only time since 1961 when Bergen County did not support the winner of the state's gubernatorial election. Chris Daggett's 5.8% of the vote was the best for a third party in a New Jersey gubernatorial election since 1913. This is the second (and most recent) time that a sitting governor of New Jersey lost a general election for the second term since 1993.

== Democratic primary ==
=== Candidates ===
==== Nominee ====
- Jon Corzine, incumbent governor (2006-2010)

==== Eliminated in primary ====
- Roger Bacon, businessman
- Carl Bergmanson, former mayor of Glen Ridge
- Jeff Boss, perennial candidate

=== Campaign ===
Although Corzine was unpopular among independents and Republicans, he polled much more highly among registered Democrats. His three opponents were former Glen Ridge mayor Carl Bergmanson, who ran on a platform of fiscal discipline, governmental reform, and removing the tolls on the Garden State Parkway, the New Jersey Turnpike and the Atlantic City Expressway; perennial candidate Jeff Boss; and businessman and former Congressional candidate Roger Bacon. A Quinnipiac poll conducted shortly before the primary and released on May 20, 2009, indicated that 65% of Democratic primary voters would vote for Corzine, with the other three candidates each receiving 4%–5%. Also, 62% of Democrats approved of him while 24% did not.

On the primary election night, when Corzine accepted his party's nomination, Vice President Joe Biden campaigned for him, saying that he and President Barack Obama would help him get re-elected. Biden also characterized Corzine as "America's governor."

=== Results ===
County results Corzine ≥ 50% Corzine ≥ 60% Corzine ≥ 70% Corzine ≥ 80%

Democratic Primary results
Party	Candidate	Votes	%
Democratic	Jon Corzine (incumbent)	154,448	77.18
Democratic	Carl Bergmanson	17,125	8.56
Democratic	Jeff Boss	16,639	8.31
Democratic	Roger Bacon	11,908	5.95
Total votes		200,120	100.00

== Republican primary ==
=== Candidates ===
==== Nominee ====
- Chris Christie, former U.S. attorney (2002-2008) and former Morris County freeholder

==== Eliminated in primary ====
- Steve Lonegan, former mayor of Bogota
- Rick Merkt, state assemblyman from Mendham

==== Disqualified ====
- David Brown, businessman
- Christian Keller

Lonegan disputed the nominating petitions of Brown, Keller and Levine, and administrative judges ruled that their petitions fell below the threshold of 1,000 valid signatures. As such, their names were removed from the primary ballot.

=== Campaign ===
Most of the focus in the primary campaign was on the Republican contest between the front-runner, former U.S. Attorney Chris Christie, who was heavily favored by the party establishment, and former Bogota mayor Steve Lonegan. Both sides released numerous television and radio advertisements, as well as mailers to registered Republicans. Christie focused on his record of fighting corruption, while Lonegan emphasized his credentials as a lifelong conservative.

On April 1, Lonegan released the first attack ad of the 2009 campaign, and released another one on April 19. He accused Christie of ethically dubious awarding of no-bid monitor contracts during his tenure as U.S. attorney, described him as a moderate, and made other allegations. However, on April 24, Christie responded with a new 60 second radio ad noting that Lonegan has lost many elections in his career, including losing by a landslide to Steve Rothman for Congress in 1998 and finishing fourth (out of seven) in the Republican primary of the 2005 New Jersey Governor's race. He also claimed that Lonegan's "flat tax" plan, a crucial part of the candidate's platform which calls for applying the same income tax rate to everyone, "would raise taxes on almost 70 percent of New Jersey workers", and characterized Lonegan's previous attacks as "desperate."

Among those to endorse Christie in the primary were former New Jersey governor Thomas Kean, businessman Steve Forbes, former New York City Mayor Rudy Giuliani and former Massachusetts governor Mitt Romney. In addition, all county GOP organizations endorsed Christie, as did several New Jersey congressmen.

Joe the Plumber endorsed Lonegan and campaigned with him on May 5. On May 14, United States Rep. Ron Paul (R-Texas) sent out an email endorsing Lonegan and asking for donations to Lonegan's campaign. Economists Art Laffer and Peter Schiff also endorsed Lonegan, as did New Jersey General Assemblyman Michael J. Doherty.

Christie was declared the winner of the primary, defeating Lonegan by a margin of 55 to 42 percent. Lonegan immediately endorsed Christie, stating:

It's our job now, it's your job now to change our focus on taking this Republican Party in a new direction. We must have one common cause, one cause. We need to beat Jon Corzine.

=== Debates ===
Two state-sponsored televised debates were held before the primary. The first, on May 12, was broadcast on NJN, while the other, held on May 17, was broadcast on the New York television station WABC-TV. Both debates were between Christie and Lonegan. Because Merkt did not meet the fund-raising or spending thresholds set by the state, he was not allowed to participate. However, all three candidates were featured in two additional radio-only privately sponsored debates shortly before the primary.

=== Fundraising ===
Candidate	Amount of money
Chris Christie	$3 million
Steve Lonegan	$500,000
Rick Merkt	$44,000

=== Polling ===
Source	Dates Administered	Chris Christie	Steve Lonegan	Richard Merkt	Difference between two top candidates
Rasmussen Reports	May 27, 2009	46%	35%	4%	11%
Monmouth University	May 20, 2009	50%	32%	2%	18%
Rasmussen Reports	May 13, 2009	39%	29%	3%	10%
Quinnipiac University	April 4–20, 2009	46%	37%	2%	9%
Fairleigh Dickinson University	March 30 – April 5, 2009	44%	21%	2%	22%
Quinnipiac University	March 4–9, 2009	45%	19%	1%	21%
Fairleigh Dickinson University	February 25 – March 2, 2009	43%	15%	1%	28%
Quinnipiac University	January 29 – February 2, 2009	44%	17%	2%	27%
Fairleigh Dickinson University	January 2–7, 2009	32%	15%	5%	17%

=== Results ===
County results Christie ≥ 50% Christie ≥ 60% Lonegan ≥ 40% Lonegan ≥ 50%

Republican primary results
Party	Candidate	Votes	%
Republican	Chris Christie	184,085	55.08
Republican	Steve Lonegan	140,946	42.17
Republican	Rick Merkt	9,184	2.75
Total votes		334,215	100.00

== General election ==
=== Candidates ===
- Chris Christie, former United States Attorney and Morris County Freeholder (Republican)

- Running mate: Kim Guadagno, Monmouth County Sheriff

- Jon Corzine, incumbent governor and former United States Senator (Democratic)

- Running mate: Loretta Weinberg, state senator

- Jason Cullen, Riverdale Board of Health chairman (People Not Politics)
- Chris Daggett, former New Jersey Commissioner of Environmental Protection and Deputy Chief of Staff to Governor Thomas Kean (Independent)

- Running mate: Frank J. Esposito, Kean University professor

- Kenneth Kaplan, real estate broker and perennial candidate (Libertarian)

- Running mate: John Paff

- Joshua Leinsdorf, former Princeton School Board member (Fair Election Party)

- Running mate: Joanne Miller

- Alvin Lindsay Jr., (Lindsay for Governor)

- Running mate: Eugene Harley

- David R. Meiswinkle, attorney (Middle Class Empowerment)

- Running mate: Noelani Musicaro

- Greg Pason, writer and national secretary of the Socialist Party USA (Socialist)

- Running mate: Costantino Rozzo

- Kostas Petris, restaurateur (For The People)

- Running mate: August Petris

- Gary T. Steele, attorney (Leadership, Independence, Vision)

- Running mate: Nancy A. Pennella

- Gary Stein (different slogans in each county)

- Running mate: Cynthia Stein, the nominee's wife

Write-in candidates

- Carl Peter Klapper, populist poet and Johnsonville Press columnist
- Angela Lariscy, communist political organizer and perennial candidate (Socialist Workers)
- Eddie McOwskey, perennial candidate (Balance Ya Taxes)
- John Meehan, Bethlehem Township committeeman
- Uncle Floyd, comedian (Independent)

=== Campaign ===
Corzine kicked off his campaign in June criticizing his Republican opponents and tying them to former president George W. Bush. Corzine also released the first two television campaign ads, both were 30 second spots, released on January 5. One of the ads compared the two candidates' positions on social issues. The Republican Governors Association shot back, releasing two of its own television ads showing how Corzine had broken campaign promises on June 16.

Corzine was criticized by GOP leadership for granting contract concessions to state workers, by granting them an additional seven paid days off, after threats were made to protest the primary election night event where Vice President Biden was the keynote speaker. It is estimated that these concessions will cost the state $40 million.

The election became a three-way race on July 7, when independent candidate Christopher Daggett, a former regional administrator for the Environmental Protection Agency and Deputy Chief of Staff to former governor Thomas Kean, announced that he had raised enough money to qualify for public funds and to qualify for participation in the debates. Both Democratic and Republican leaders took Daggett's campaign seriously. Only a day before the election, the New Jersey Democratic State Committee admitted to funding political robocalls in Somerset County attacking Christie and urging a vote for Daggett. Party chairman Joe Cryan initially denied the charges until it was revealed that the disclaimer at the end of the call declared it was paid for by "Victory '09, a project of the NJDSC," the abbreviation referring to the state Democratic party. Kevin Roberts, a spokesman for the New Jersey Republican State Committee, attacked Cryan as an "outright liar," adding that "Corzine's party boss knows what we know: Jon Corzine's record is so dreadful that they feel they need to try to trick voters into a second term." Similarly, state senator Marcia Karrow, a Christie campaign coordinator in Hunterdon County, declared that Daggett voters "might as well pull the lever for Corzine."

On July 15, the New Jersey chapter of a liberal environmental group, the Sierra Club, released a report critical of the Corzine administration's environmental record, with New Jersey Executive Director Jeff Tittel stating that group believes "this will go down as the worst environmental administration in state history." The state organization formally endorsed Daggett on August 17, its first endorsement of an independent candidate.

Corzine was the target of a vigorous advertising campaign funded by the Christie campaign and the Republican Governors Association, attacking his record as governor, tying him to corrupt officials, and assailing him for failing to deliver on his campaign promises. The RGA set up a mock newspaper website, "The Corzine Times", collecting newspaper articles critical of Corzine.

One of Corzine's main lines of attack involved Christie's ties to the unpopular former president George W. Bush, who appointed Christie to the U.S. Attorney's office in 2001. In August 2009, Bush political strategist Karl Rove revealed that he had held conversations with Christie about a potential gubernatorial run during Christie's time as U.S. Attorney. U.S. Attorneys are prohibited from engaging in partisan political activities by the Hatch Act of 1939. Corzine quickly incorporated this into his advertisements targeting Christie.

The Corzine campaign filed requests under the Freedom of Information Act since March 2009 seeking records of budgets, travel expenses, and no-bid contracts from Christie's tenure as U.S. Attorney. The U.S. Attorney's office did not release the requested documents before election day. State Sen. Loretta Weinberg demanded an end to the "logjam" by the U.S. Attorney's office. On August 12, Christie's successor, acting U.S. attorney Ralph J. Marra, Jr., issued a press release defending the office:

The U.S. Attorney's Office has worked as professionally and expeditiously as it can to fulfill all the requests and has been in virtually daily contact with the Executive Office for United States Attorneys (EOUSA) in Washington to accomplish this burdensome and continuous task. ... At absolutely no time has there been an effort to slow down or inhibit the FOIA process.

On August 18, 2009, Christie acknowledged that he had loaned $46,000 to First Assistant U.S. Attorney for New Jersey Michele Brown two years ago, while serving as her superior as the state's U.S. attorney, and that he had failed to report the loan on either his income tax returns or his mandatory financial disclosure report to the New Jersey Election Law Enforcement Commission. In response to the disclosure of the financial relationship between Christie and Brown, Weinberg called on Brown to recuse herself from the task of retrieving U.S. Attorney's Office records requested by the Corzine campaign under the Freedom of Information Act. On August 25, Brown resigned from her post, stating that she does not want to be "a distraction" for the office. Although the Corzine campaign sought to make the loan a major campaign issue, a Quinnipiac poll showed that only 43% of voters believed that the loan controversy was a legitimate attack, while a plurality of 49% called it an unfair attack.

As of September 20, Corzine had put out 4,806 television advertisements to Christie's 1,393 ads.

=== Debates ===
Corzine, Christie, and Daggett debated each other three times by the election. Two debates were sanctioned by the state's Election Law Enforcement Commission; Christie and Daggett were required to participate in these debates, as they received public financing. Corzine did not seek public financing but appeared in both ELEC debates. The first debate, sanctioned by the ELEC and sponsored by NJN, Gannett New Jersey, and The Philadelphia Inquirer, was held on October 1 in Trenton. It was televised on NJN. It was widely reported by mainstream media that Chris Daggett won the first debate.

The second ELEC-sanctioned debate, sponsored by Fox News, The Record, WWOR-TV out of Secaucus, and WTXF-TV out of Philadelphia, Pennsylvania, was held on October 16 at William Paterson University in Wayne. It was televised on WWOR-TV and WTXF-TV.

All three candidates appeared in a third debate, which was not sanctioned by the ELEC, that was held on October 22. The debate was broadcast on the radio on WBGO, a Newark-based jazz station, and was simulcast on WNYC out of New York City, WHYY-FM out of Philadelphia, and public radio stations throughout the state of New Jersey. Christie and Daggett agreed to participate in a fourth debate, broadcast on the radio on New Jersey 101.5; Corzine declined to participate.

=== Lieutenant governor factor ===
This was the first gubernatorial election since the position of lieutenant governor was created and the candidates were the first gubernatorial candidates in New Jersey history to pick running mates. All twelve candidates on the ballot selected their running mates by the July 27, 2009 deadline.

Christie, as the Republican nominee for governor, selected Kim Guadagno, the sheriff of Monmouth County. Others mentioned for the post had included former congressman Bob Franks, State Senators Diane Allen and Jennifer Beck, and Bergen County Clerk Kathleen Donovan.

Corzine, as the Democratic nominee, selected State Senator Loretta Weinberg. Other mentioned for the post had included Newark Mayor and future U.S. senator Cory Booker, New Jersey senators Nia Gill and Barbara Buono, New Jersey General Assemblywoman Bonnie Watson Coleman, and wealthy businessman Randal Pinkett.

Daggett, having qualified for matching funds, selected Ocean Township's Frank J. Esposito, a longtime professor and administrator at Kean University who served as an advisor to the Commissioner of Education in the Thomas Kean administration, as his running mate. Others mentioned for the post had included Edison Mayor Jun Choi and Passaic County freeholder James Gallagher.

There was also a debate between the three major candidates for lieutenant governor: Loretta Weinberg, Kim Guadagno, and Frank Esposito. This debate, sponsored by Leadership New Jersey, was held at Monmouth University in West Long Branch on October 8. It was televised on News 12 New Jersey and broadcast on the radio on New Jersey 101.5.

=== Regional factors ===
In New Jersey, Republicans tend to be strongest in the Northwest and Shore regions of the state, Democrats tend to be strongest in urban areas, and suburban areas such as those in Mercer County, Middlesex County, Union County, Passaic County, and Bergen County are considered toss-ups. In the Democratic primary, Corzine got over 70% of the vote only in the urban areas, doing relatively poorly among suburban Democrats. His weakest performance was in Warren County, where he won with just 55% of the vote. On the other hand, Corzine performed strongly in Bergen County, winning with almost 87% of the vote. In the Republican primary, Christie lost some key Republican strongholds, such as Hunterdon County (where he received 45.8%) and Warren County (where he received 46.9%) to Lonegan.

According to a September 1 Quinnipiac University poll, Hudson County and Essex County were the only counties where a majority of voters viewed Corzine favorably. Corzine had upside-down ratings in all 19 other counties in that poll. In contrast, Christie had upside-down ratings in those two counties but was viewed favorably by pluralities of voters in every other county except for Atlantic County, Ocean County, and Monmouth County, where a majority of voters viewed him favorably.

=== Political factors ===
Taxes and the economy were overwhelmingly the top issues in this campaign. Corzine's strongest issue was on education, but it was the most important issue for only 4% of likely voters. Christie attacked Corzine's record of raising taxes, failing to deliver property tax relief, and presiding over a period of unusually high unemployment in the state. Corzine pointed to the global economic recession as the reason for the state's economic troubles. Republicans contended that Corzine's policies led to over-taxation and economic decline, causing an out-migration of residents documented in a report by the Edward J. Bloustein School of Planning and Public Policy at Rutgers University.

Christie also campaigned on the issues of ethics, reducing corruption, and ending fiscal waste. These issues were brought back to the forefront of the debate after 44 individuals, including several public officials in New Jersey, were arrested by the FBI in July 2009 in Operation Bid Rig. Corzine was not a target of the probe; however, the office of a member of his cabinet, Commissioner of Community Affairs Joseph Doria, was raided by the FBI in connection with Operation Bid Rig. Governor Corzine asked for, and accepted, Doria's resignation on July 23. Doria has not been charged with any crime. Although Corzine has not been accused of any wrongdoing, the corruption sting, which resulted in the arrests of mostly Democratic officials, nevertheless further injured Corzine's reputation. Former EPA Regional Administrator Alan J. Steinberg predicted in his July 23 column that the corruption scandal would doom Corzine's re-election bid, as ethics would become a major issue again, thus helping Christie. State Senator Ray Lesniak, a prominent Democrat, acknowledged that "If it's about ethics, Corzine loses. Not because Jon Corzine's weak on ethics, but because it's Chris Christie's strength, and now it's national news."

Under normal circumstances, Corzine would have been considered to have an inherent advantage in the "blue state" of New Jersey. No Republican has won New Jersey's electoral votes in a presidential election since George H. W. Bush in 1988. Prior to the 2009 election, no Republican had won a statewide election in New Jersey since 1997, when Governor Christine Todd Whitman won re-election with 47.1% of the vote. The last Republican to win a statewide election in New Jersey with over 50% of the vote was incumbent governor Thomas Kean in 1985, who won with 71% of the vote. No Republican has won a U.S. Senate election in New Jersey since liberal Republican Clifford Case in 1972.

Between February 2009 and the end of his term, Corzine's approval ratings ranged between 33% and 42%. His disapproval ratings ranged between 46% and 66%. These weak poll numbers were the result of several factors. Going into the 2009 fiscal year, New Jersey faced a budget shortfall of approximately $3 billion. Corzine attempted to close this gap by enacting pay freezes and furloughs of state employees, a policy that was unpopular with many public employee unions, a major Democratic constituency. Corzine had also cut state aid to local governments, which hurt his standing in the urban areas which made up another key segment of the Democrats' base. Across the state, voters expressed sentiments that taxes were too high and too few budget cuts were being made, and further public dissatisfaction mounted following the economic recession in 2008. By the end of May 2009, Corzine's job approval was the lowest of any New Jersey governor in modern history, putting him behind Christie in early election polling. These weak numbers indicated that he could be vulnerable against a strong Republican challenger. Moreover, no Democrat has won re-election to the state governor's office since Brendan Byrne's victory in 1977.

Some thought that Corzine would benefit from the popularity of President Barack Obama, who carried the state in 2008 with 57% of the vote and had higher approval ratings than Corzine had. However, Obama's approval ratings in the state varied, ranging from as high as 68% in a June Quinnipiac poll to as low as 53% in a PPP poll, which is lower than what he obtained on election day in 2008. Another poll in July gave him 55% approval in the state, also less than what he obtained on election day. In the same poll 47% believed Obama would help Corzine's numbers in the election by campaigning with him.

After Vice President Biden's June appearance at a "poorly attended" Corzine primary-night event, the Barack Obama administration approached President of the New Jersey Senate and former governor Richard Codey to consider running in the governor's place if the incumbent withdrew from his reelection bid, citing polls showing that Codey led Christie. Obama held a campaign rally for Corzine on July 16. Originally the rally was set to be held at Rutgers University, but ultimately it was held at the PNC Bank Arts Center instead.

=== Endorsements ===
Chris Christie (R)

Newspapers

- Asbury Park Press
- Burlington County Times
- Courier News
- Courier-Post
- Daily Record
- Home News Tribune
- New York Post
- The Press of Atlantic City
- The Trentonian

Organizations

- Family Research Council
- National Federation of Independent Business
- New Jersey Outdoor Alliance
- New Jersey Environmental Federation
- New Jersey Restaurant Association
Jon Corzine (D)

Newspapers

- New York Daily News
- The Jersey Journal
- The New York Times
- The Philadelphia Inquirer
- The Record
- The Times of Trenton

Elected Officials

- Barack Obama, President of the United States
- Joe Biden, Vice President of the United States
- Bob Menendez, U.S. Senator from New Jersey

Organizations

- Human Rights Campaign
- New Jersey Fraternal Order of Police
- Latino Leadership Alliance
- Planned Parenthood of New Jersey
- Dominican American Elected Officials Caucus of New Jersey
- Legislative Latino Caucus

Unions

- New Jersey Education Association
- New Jersey Police Benevolent Association
- Service Employees International Union
Chris Daggett (I)

Newspapers

- The Star-Ledger
- Recorder Newspapers
- The Express-Times

Organizations

- Sierra Club of New Jersey

=== Predictions ===
Source	Ranking	As of
Rothenberg Political Report	Tossup	October 26, 2009

=== Polling ===
View source data.

Source	Dates Administered	Jon Corzine (D)	Chris Christie (R)	Chris Daggett (I)	Undecided
Public Policy Polling	October 31 – November 1, 2009	41%	47%	11%	–
SurveyUSA/WABC-TV	October 30 – November 1, 2009	42%	45%	10%	3%
Monmouth University/Gannett	October 30 – November 1, 2009	43%	41%	8%	—
Democracy Corps	October 29 – November 1, 2009	41%	37%	15%	8%
Quinnipiac	October 27 – November 1, 2009	40%	42%	12%	6%
Fairleigh Dickinson University	October 22 – November 1, 2009	43%	41%	8%	5%
Monmouth University/Gannett	October 28–30, 2009	42%	43%	8%	5%
Rasmussen Reports	October 29, 2009	43%	46%	8%	3%
Zogby	October 27–29, 2009	40%	39%	14%	6%
Neighborhood Research	October 27–29, 2009	35%	42%	8%	15%
Democracy Corps	October 27–28, 2009	43%	38%	12%	7%
SurveyUSA/WABC-TV	October 26–28, 2009	43%	43%	11%	3%
Research 2000	October 26–28, 2009	41%	42%	14%	3%
Fairleigh Dickinson University	October 22–28, 2009	39%	41%	14%	4%
Rasmussen Reports	October 26, 2009	43%	46%	7%	4%
Public Policy Polling	October 23–26, 2009	38%	42%	13%	6%
Quinnipiac	October 20–26, 2009	43%	38%	13%	5%
Suffolk University	October 22–25, 2009	42%	33%	7%	14%
Greenberg Quinlan Rosner Research	October 21–22, 2009	42%	39%	19%	—
SurveyUSA	October 19–21, 2009	39%	41%	19%	1%
Rutgers-Eagleton	October 15–20, 2009	39%	36%	20%	5%
Rasmussen Reports	October 19, 2009	39%	41%	11%	8%
Monmouth University	October 15–18, 2009	39%	39%	14%	8%
Rasmussen Reports	October 14, 2009	41%	45%	9%	5%
SurveyUSA/WABC-TV	October 12–14, 2009	39%	40%	18%	3%
The New York Times	October 9–14, 2009	40%	37%	14%	9%
Public Policy Polling	October 9–12, 2009	39%	40%	13%	8%
Quinnipiac University	October 7–12, 2009	40%	41%	14%	5%
Neighborhood Research	October 6–8, 2009	35%	36%	11%	18%
Greenberg Quinlan Rosner Research	October 6–7, 2009	41%	38%	14%	7%
SurveyUSA	October 5–7, 2009	40%	43%	14%	2%
Penn, Schoen & Berland Assoc.	September 30 – October 5, 2009	38%	43%	13%	6%
Rasmussen Reports	October 5, 2009	44%	47%	6%	3%
Fairleigh Dickinson University	September 28 – October 5, 2009	38%	37%	17%	8%
Research 2000	September 28–30, 2009	42%	46%	7%	5%
Monmouth University	September 24–29, 2009	40%	43%	8%	9%
Quinnipiac	September 22–28, 2009	39%	43%	12%	6%
Greenberg Quinlan Rosner Research	September 22–23, 2009	39%	40%	11%	10%
Strategic Vision	September 18–20, 2009	38%	46%	8%	8%
Rasmussen Reports	September 14–17, 2009	41%	48%	6%	5%
Neighborhood Research	September 14–17, 2009	33%	40%	7%	20%
Public Policy Polling	September 11–14, 2009	35%	44%	13%	7%
Monmouth University	September 8–10, 2009	39%	47%	5%	7%
Greenberg Quinlan Rosner Research	September 8–9, 2009	38%	41%	10%	10%
Rasmussen Reports	September 9, 2009	38%	46%	6%	10%
Fairleigh Dickinson University	August 26–30, 2009	42%	47%	1%*	6%
Quinnipiac University	August 25–26, 2009	37%	47%	9%	6%
Greenberg Quinlan Rosner Research	August 25–26, 2009	41%	43%	7%	9%
Rasmussen Reports	August 25, 2009	36%	47%	7%	11%
Neighborhood Research	August 12–21, 2009	36%	39%	6%	19%
Greenberg Quinlan Rosner Research	August 11–12, 2009	35%	40%	10%	15%
Quinnipiac University	August 11, 2009	42%	51%	7%	6%
Research 2000	August 5, 2009	40%	48%	3%	9%
Rasmussen Reports	August 4, 2009	37%	50%	5%	8%
Monmouth University	July 29 – August 2, 2009	36%	50%	5%	4%
Public Policy Polling	July 24–27, 2009	36%	50%	—	14%
Strategic Vision	July 17–19, 2009	38%	53%	5%	4%
Monmouth University	July 9–14, 2009	37%	45%	4%	13%
Quinnipiac University	July 8–12, 2009	38%	47%	8%	7%
Basswood	July 7, 2009	33%	48%	–	19%
Rasmussen Reports	July 7, 2009	39%	46%	5%	10%
Public Policy Polling	June 27–29, 2009	41%	51%	–	9%
Strategic Vision	June 19–21, 2009	39%	51%	2%	8%
Quinnipiac University	June 3–8, 2009	40%	50%	1%	9%
Rasmussen Reports	June 3, 2009	38%	51%	5%	6%
Research 2000	May 25–27, 2009	39%	46%	–	15%
Rasmussen Reports	May 14, 2009	38%	47%	6%	9%
Monmouth University	April 23–25, 2009	35%	39%	2%	18%
Quinnipiac University	April 14–20, 2009	38%	45%	2%	14%
Fairleigh Dickinson University	April 5, 2009	33%	42%	—	25%
Rasmussen Reports	March 10, 2009	34%	49%	7%	10%
Quinnipiac University	March 4–9, 2009	37%	46%	1%	15%
Fairleigh Dickinson University	February 25 – March 2, 2009	32%	41%	—	27%
Quinnipiac University	January 29 – February 2, 2009	38%	44%	2%	16%
Monmouth University	January 12–14, 2009	38%	36%	2%	21%
Rasmussen Reports	January 2–7, 2009	40%	42%	5%	13%
Fairleigh Dickinson	January 2–7, 2009	40%	33%	—	26%
Quinnipiac University	November 17, 2008	42%	36%	—	—
Research 2000	September 11, 2008	43%	41%	–	16%
Zogby	August 11, 2008	45%	36%	—	—
Quinnipiac University	August 10, 2008	40%	41%	1%	17%

"*" denotes voluntary response only. In the August 26–30 FDU poll, 4% also responded "neither" or "other."

=== Results ===
New Jersey gubernatorial election, 2009
Party	Candidate	Votes	%	±%
Republican	Chris Christie	1,174,445	48.46%	▲5.43
Democratic	Jon Corzine (incumbent)	1,087,731	44.88%	▼8.59
Independent	Chris Daggett	139,579	5.76%	N/A
Libertarian	Kenneth R. Kaplan	4,830	0.20%	▼0.47
Independent	Gary T. Steele	3,585	0.15%	N/A
Independent	Jason Cullen	2,869	0.12%	N/A
Independent	David R. Meiswinkle	2,598	0.11%	N/A
Independent	Kostas Petris	2,563	0.11%	N/A
Socialist	Gregory Pason	2,085	0.09%	N/A
Independent	Gary Stein	1,625	0.07%	N/A
Independent	Joshua Leinsdorf	1,021	0.04%	N/A
Independent	Alvin Lindsay, Jr.	753	0.03%	N/A
Majority		86,714	3.58%	−6.87%
Turnout		2,423,684		
Republican gain from Democratic		Swing		

==== By county ====
County	Christie %	Christie votes	Corzine %	Corzine votes	Daggett %	Daggett votes	Other %	Other votes
Atlantic	48.53%	35,724	45.32%	33,360	4.91%	3,611	1.24%	913
Bergen	46.26%	121,446	48.52%	127,386	4.74%	12,452	0.48%	1,262
Burlington	48.41%	66,723	45.79%	63,114	4.59%	6,333	1.21%	1,669
Camden	39.29%	52,337	54.93%	73,171	4.63%	6,166	1.15%	1,526
Cape May	54.34%	18,992	38.28%	13,379	6.08%	2,126	1.29%	451
Cumberland	41.75%	14,079	50.69%	17,092	5.82%	1,962	1.74%	586
Essex	27.53%	50,240	67.31%	122,640	4.52%	8,240	0.74%	1,357
Gloucester	47.26%	39,815	43.99%	37,066	8.04%	6,777	0.70%	593
Hudson	26.08%	30,820	69.44%	82,075	3.40%	4,017	1.08%	1,280
Hunterdon	65.75%	33,360	25.41%	12,893	8.08%	4,098	0.76%	387
Mercer	39.27%	39,769	54.51%	55,199	5.36%	5,424	0.86%	874
Middlesex	47.42%	94,506	45.02%	89,732	6.54%	13,034	1.02%	2,023
Monmouth	62.24%	129,039	31.19%	64,672	5.76%	11,952	0.80%	1,658
Morris	60.04%	99,085	31.26%	51,586	8.07%	13,321	0.62%	1,031
Ocean	65.73%	124,238	28.44%	53,761	4.80%	9,068	1.03%	1,955
Passaic	43.78%	48,500	51.46%	57,010	3.87%	4,288	0.89%	981
Salem	47.18%	9,599	40.91%	8,323	9.88%	2,011	2.02%	411
Somerset	56.23%	57,481	34.33%	35,089	8.72%	8,911	0.72%	740
Sussex	63.69%	31,749	25.82%	12,870	9.15%	4,563	1.33%	664
Union	42.15%	56,769	51.13%	68,867	5.94%	7,999	0.79%	1,058
Warren	62.35%	20,174	26.10%	8,446	9.97%	3,226	1.58%	510

Counties that flipped from Democratic to Republican

- Atlantic (largest municipality: Egg Harbor Township)
- Burlington (largest municipality: Evesham)
- Gloucester (largest municipality: Washington Township)
- Middlesex (largest municipality: Edison)
- Salem (largest municipality: Pennsville Township)

== See also ==
- Politics of New Jersey
- 2009 New Jersey General Assembly elections
