= Frank J. Esposito =

American historian (born 1941)

Frank Esposito

President of Kean University Interim
- In office March 2002 – July 1, 2003
- Succeeded by: Dawood Farahi

Personal details
- Born: June 9, 1941 (age 85) Ocean City, New Jersey, U.S.
- Party: Independent
- Education: Glassboro State College (BA, MA); Rutgers University (PhD)

Frank John Esposito (born June 9, 1941) is an American academic administrator and political candidate. He is the Distinguished Service Professor of History at Kean University in Union, New Jersey. In the 2009 New Jersey gubernatorial race, Esposito was named by independent candidate Chris Daggett as his running mate Lieutenant Governor.

== Early life and education ==
Esposito was born on June 9, 1941, in Ocean City, New Jersey. He graduated from Ocean City High School in 1959 and received B.A. and M.A. degrees from Glassboro State College (now Rowan University). He earned a Ph.D. in American history from Rutgers University in 1976. for his 750 page PhD dissertation, Indian-white Relations in New Jersey, 1609-1802.

== Career ==
In 1970, Esposito first joined Kean University (then Newark State Teachers College), when he became an assistant professor of educational arts and systems for the College of Education. After receiving his Ph.D. from Rutgers, he was promoted to assistant dean. He later became acting dean for three years. In 1984, he became vice president for Academic Affairs. After working on a national study to evaluate school choice systems, Esposito returned to Kean as a full-time history professor in 1990. He became the first dean of the Nathan Weiss Graduate College in 1998.

In March 2002, Esposito was elected to serve as interim university president while a search was conducted for a permanent president. When Dawood Farahi was chosen, Esposito returned to teaching in the Department of History. He was named interim dean of the College of Education in 2006, serving until 2008.

On July 27, 2009, independent gubernatorial candidate Christopher Daggett named Esposito as his running mate. If elected, Esposito would be the first Lieutenant Governor of New Jersey. Since Daggett qualified for matching funds, Esposito was eligible to participate in the televised Lieutenant Governor debate with Republican candidate Kim Guadagno and Democratic candidate Loretta Weinberg, held on October 8, 2009.

== Personal life ==
Esposito lives in Ocean Township with his wife, Sherry. He is registered as an independent.

== Published works ==
Esposito has published seven books:

- Travelling New Jersey (Wise, 1978)
- Madison: An Intimate History of A Community in Transition (Compton, 1985)
- Public School Choice: National Trends and Initiatives (NJ Dept. of Education, 1989)
- Ocean City, NJ, two volumes, co-author, (Arcadia, 1996, 1998)
- Victorian New Jersey (Kean University Press, 2005)
- Manhattan's Musical Heritage, co-author, (Arcadia, 2005)
