= Tim Lowly =

American singer-songwriter (born 1958)

- Born: Timothy Hadlock Grubbs; 1958 (age 67–68); Hendersonville, North Carolina, U.S.
- Education: Calvin College
- Occupations: Artist; musician; teacher
- Style: Egg tempera
- Spouse: Sherrie Rubingh (m. 1981)
- Children: 1
- Website: timothylowly.com

Tim Lowly (born 1958 in Hendersonville, North Carolina) is a Chicago artist, musician, and teacher. He is known for compassionate egg tempera pictures of children in mysterious circumstances.

== Biography ==
Tim Lowly was born Timothy Hadlock Grubbs. From the age of three he lived in South Korea, where his parents were Presbyterian missionaries. He learned piano and guitar and still plays and composes folk-rock music. Lowly attended Calvin College in Grand Rapids, Michigan, majoring in art. He married Sherrie Rubingh in 1981, and rather than subordinate anyone's last name, they changed their surname to Lowly.

== Career ==
After a visit to Korea and Europe, Lowly took up the exacting renaissance art of egg tempera painting, in which egg yolk is mixed with pigment to make paint. Since 2000 Lowly had primarily worked with matte acrylic.

The Lowlys had a daughter, Temma, in 1985, who was brain-damaged and is frequently the subject of Mr. Lowly's paintings. Lowly says, "Part of my fairly political agenda is to say that disabled children are a part of life. These are not freaks. What I'm saying is that we should advocate for eyes of compassion that see human beings as human beings, rather than separating them into the beautiful, the ugly, the normal, the freak."

Lowly has been awarded an Individual Artist Grant from the Michigan Council for the Arts in 1987 and Fellowships in Visual Art from the Illinois Arts Council in 1995 and 2005. Tim Lowly was gallery director and professor at North Park University in Chicago from 1994 to 2023. Currently he is focusing on art making and resides in Elk Grove Village, Illinois.

== Collections ==
- The Arkansas Art Center, Little Rock, Arkansas
- Calvin University, Grand Rapids, Michigan
- Columbus State University, Columbus, Georgia
- Davidson College, Davidson, North Carolina
- Frye Museum, Seattle, Washington
- The Graham Center Museum, Wheaton College, Wheaton, Illinois
- Grand Valley State University, Grand Rapids, Michigan
- The Grunwald Center for the Graphic Arts, UCLA, Los Angeles
- The Kalamazoo Institute of Arts, Kalamazoo, Michigan
- The Kresge Art Museum, East Lansing, Michigan
- The McDonald's Corporate Collection, Oak Brook, Illinois
- The Metropolitan Museum of Art, New York
- The Minneapolis Institute of Art, Minneapolis, Minnesota
- Millikin University, Decatur, Illinois
- The Rockford Art Museum, Rockford, Illinois
- The Charles A. Wustum Museum of Fine Arts, Racine, Wisconsin
