= Kean University =

Public university in New Jersey, US

- Former name: List: Newark Normal School (1855–1913); New Jersey State Normal School (1913–1937); New Jersey State Teachers College (1937–1959); Newark State College (1959–1973); Kean College of New Jersey (1973–1997)
- Motto: Semper Discens (Latin)
- Motto in English: Always Learning
- Type: Public university
- Established: April 1855; 171 years ago
- Accreditation: MSCHE
- Academic affiliations: Sea-grant
- Endowment: $78.7 million (2020)
- President: Lamont O. Repollet
- Provost: David Birdsell
- Faculty: 376 full-time, 1,123 part-time
- Students: 13,905 (fall 2024)
- Undergraduates: 11,758 (fall 2024)
- Postgraduates: 2,147 (fall 2024)
- Location: Union, New Jersey, U.S.
- Campus: Metropolitan, urban, mid-size city 121.5 acres (49.2 ha) (Main Campus) 35.4 acres (14.3 ha) (East Campus) 28.5 acres (11.5 ha) (Liberty Hall Campus)
- Media Team: The Cougar's Byte
- Newspaper: The Tower
- Colors: Kean Blue; Light Blue
- Nickname: Cougars
- Sporting affiliations: NCAA Division III-NJAC; CSAC, CVC
- Mascot: Keanu the Cougar
- Website: kean.edu
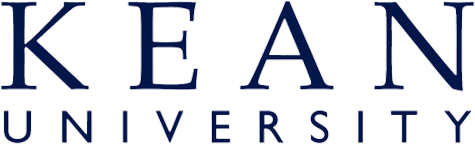

Kean University (/keɪn/) is a public university in Union, Elizabeth, Hillside, Jefferson, and Jersey City, New Jersey. It is part of New Jersey's public system of higher education and is a state-designated research university.

The university was founded in 1855 in Newark, New Jersey, as the Newark Normal School, then became New Jersey State Teachers College in 1937. In 1958, the college was relocated from Newark to Union Township, site of the Kean family's ancestral home at Liberty Hall. After its move to the historic Livingston-Kean Estate, which includes the entire Liberty Hall acreage, the historic James Townley House, and Kean Hall, which historically housed the library of United States Senator Hamilton Fish Kean and served as a political meeting place, the school became Newark State College, a comprehensive institution providing a full range of academic programs and majors. Renamed Kean College of New Jersey in 1973, the institution earned university status on September 26, 1997, becoming Kean University of New Jersey.

Kean University is the fourth-largest institution of higher education in New Jersey and currently comprises five colleges and the Nathan Weiss Graduate College. Kean University also hosts research institutions including the New Jersey Center for Science, Technology and Mathematics, the Kean University Human Rights Institute, the Holocaust Resource Center, the Wynona Moore Lipman Ethnic Studies Center, and Liberty Hall. It has a satellite campus in Toms River, New Jersey, a campus in the Skylands Region of New Jersey, and Wenzhou–Kean University a stand-alone joint venture university in Wenzhou, China. In early 2025, Kean University submitted a proposal to acquire New Jersey City University (NJCU). On March 5, 2025, the NJCU Board of Trustees voted to move forward with the proposal. The proposal changed the name from NJCU to Kean Jersey City, officially becoming part of the system of Kean campuses on July 1, 2026.

== History ==
=== Livingston-Kean Estate ===
==== Livingston, Hamilton, and the American Revolution ====
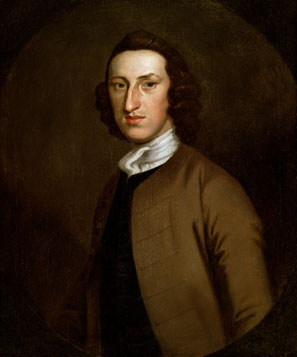
Governor William Livingston supervised the construction of Liberty Hall, initially a home that quickly became a key place in the shaping of United States

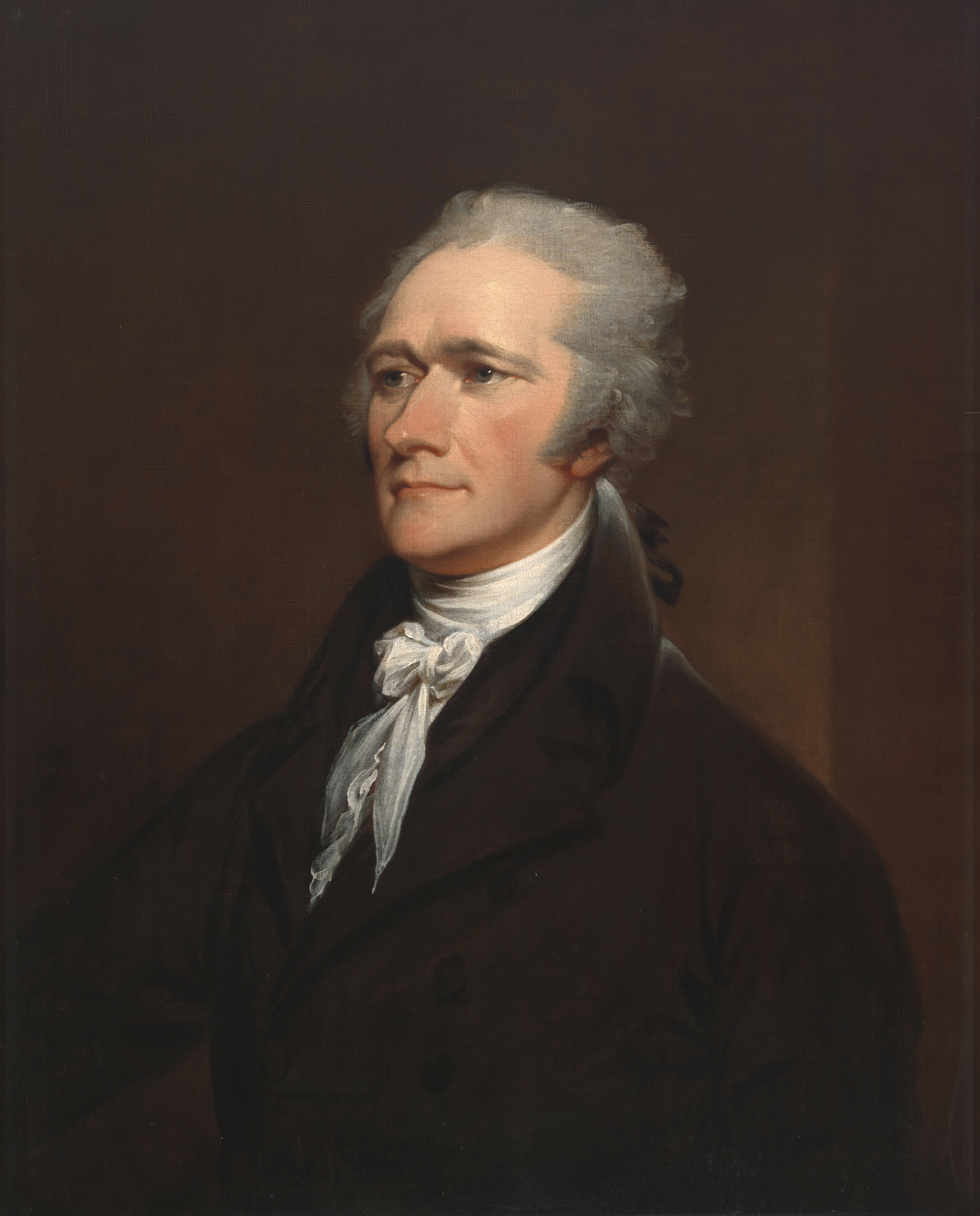
Alexander Hamilton, a Founding Father and the first United States Secretary of the Treasury, resided at Liberty Hall with Livingston while attending academy in Elizabethtown

The building of the estate on which Kean University is situated was begun in 1760, when lawyer William Livingston, who would become New Jersey's first elected governor on August 31, 1776, and a Revolutionary War patriot and signer of the United States Constitution, bought 120 acres (0.49 km^{2}) in then-Connecticut Farms and Elizabethtown, across the Hudson River from his New York City home, in hopes of establishing a country residence. By 1772, extensive grounds, gardens, and orchards had been developed and a 14-room Georgian-style house had been built under the supervision of Livingston. In its first year of occupancy the new house, christened Liberty Hall, was the residence of both Livingston and Alexander Hamilton. In 1773, Livingston moved to the home with his wife, Susannah French of New Brunswick, and their children, full-time.

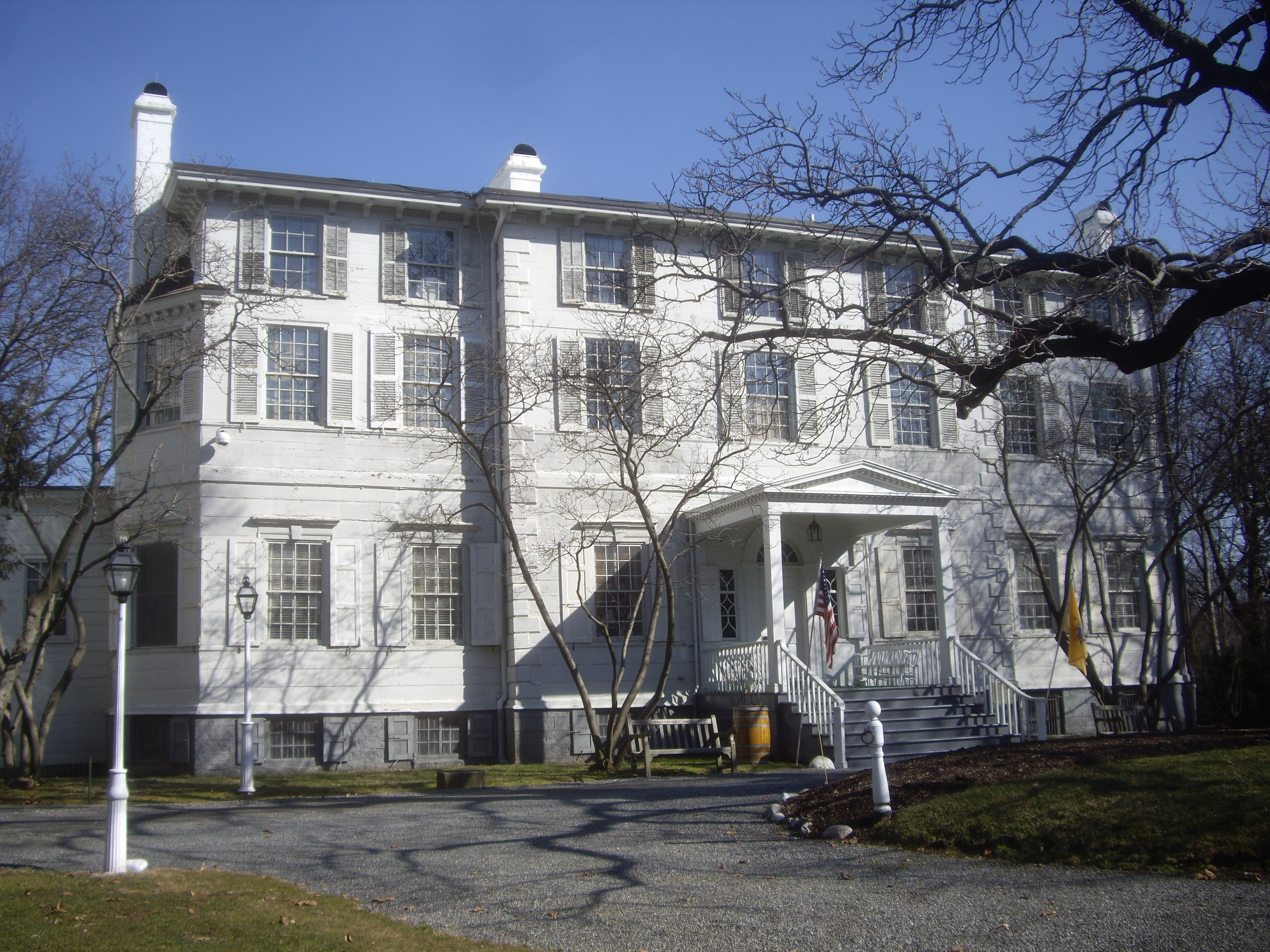
Liberty Hall, the ancestral home of the Livingston and Kean families and an important center of Revolution-era American politics and culture, was built in 1760 by New Jersey's first governor, William Livingston. The mansion and grounds, on Kean's Liberty Hall Campus in Union, now serve as an American history museum and center for historic research

Liberty Hall experienced damage from the Revolutionary War by both British and American forces, and the property featured prominently in the Revolutionary War's Battle of Connecticut Farms. The property was restored and Livingston continued to maintain the gardens and grounds as governor until his 1790 death. The estate passed to Livingston's son, future Associate Justice of the United States Supreme Court Henry Brockholst Livingston. In 1798, the house was sold to George Richard Belasise, also known as Lord Bolingbroke, and his wife Isabella. The new owners established an English boxwood maze that still stands today and made extensive additions to the principal outbuildings of the property, established or improved a large hot house, and developed the gardens, introducing rare shrubs and trees to the grounds, and possibly laying out the grounds west of the mansion.

In 1811, the Kean family acquired the Livingston estate when Peter Kean purchased Liberty Hall in trust for his mother Susan Livingston Kean Niemcewicz (women not being eligible to own property in their own right at the time). Susan Livingston Kean, a niece of Governor Livingston, was the widow of John Kean, a Continental Congress delegate and advocate for the ratification of the Constitution in South Carolina who served as the first cashier of the Bank of the United States. Having died from a respiratory disease that developed as a result of being held prisoner of war at sea during the Revolution, Kean died at 39 and Susan Livingston Kean remarried to Count Julian Niemcewicz, a Polish nobleman who fled Poland after fighting unsuccessfully for Polish independence from Russia but returned in the wake of Napoleon's successful campaigns. To honor her second husband Susan Kean changed the name of Liberty Hall to Ursino, the name of Niemcewicz's Polish estate.

Peter Kean, the only son of Susan and John Kean, who married Sarah Sabina Morris, a granddaughter of Lewis Morris, the first royal governor of New Jersey, and served as colonel of the Fourth Regiment of New Jersey and an escort of Lafayette on his tour of New Jersey predeceased his mother. His son, John Kean II, inherited Liberty Hall. John Kean II, who served on the staff of Governor Pennington with the rank of colonel, was an original stockholder of the Camden and Amboy Railroad, served as the first president of the Elizabeth and Somerville Railroad, as a vice president of the Central Railroad of New Jersey, as president of the National Bank of New Jersey, as president of the Elizabethtown Gaslight Company (later known as Elizabethtown Gas Company) and Elizabethtown Water Company lived at Liberty Hall for 60 years and made the most dramatically significant changes to the house and property in its history, transforming the house into a 50-room Victorian Italianate structure.

Another John Kean, son of John Kean II and Lucinetta Halsted Kean ("Lucy Kean"), inherited the estate after their deaths. John Kean served in the United States House of Representatives from 1883 to 1885, and again from 1887 to 1889, and in the United States Senate from 1899 to 1911. Senator Kean lived at Liberty Hall when not in Washington, D.C., and held annual New Year's receptions for his political supporters at the estate. After the death of Senator John Kean the house passed to his nephew, Captain John Kean, a National Guard cavalryman and president of the National State Bank, the Elizabethtown Water Company, and the Elizabethtown Consolidated Gas Company. Captain John Kean was the son of Katharine Winthrop Kean and United States Senator Hamilton Fish Kean whose library was housed at Kean Hall, a building constructed for that specific purpose in 1912. A frequent political meeting place in the first years of its life, Kean Hall now houses the undergraduate admissions office and administrative offices including the Presidential Suite and the conference room for the Kean University Board of Trustees. Captain John Kean's wife, Mary Alice Barney Kean, an historian and preservationist, was the last resident of Liberty Hall and was responsible for much of its preservation.

==== Historic non-residents associated with Liberty Hall ====
Liberty Hall has had many distinguished visitors, including Martha Washington, who stayed at Liberty Hall during her husband's inauguration and President George Washington who visited his wife there not long after his swearing-in in New York City. Supreme Court Chief Justice John Jay was married to Governor Livingston's daughter, Sarah, at Liberty Hall. Other guests included Lewis Morris, Lafayette, Elias Boudinot, and several presidents after Washington, including Ulysses S. Grant, William Howard Taft, Herbert Hoover, Gerald Ford, George H. W. Bush, and Bill Clinton.

=== Newark Normal School ===
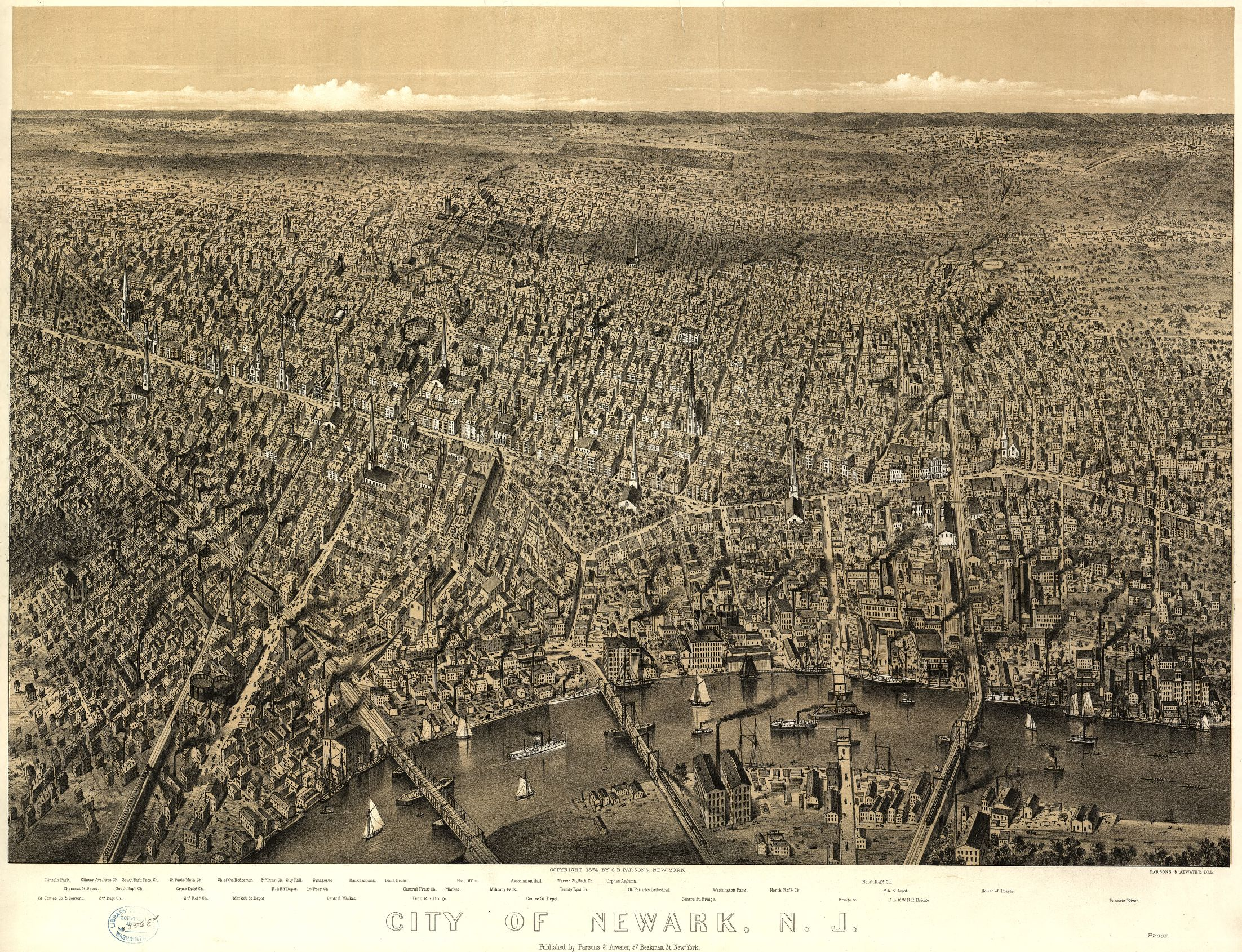
Newark, New Jersey was a growing, increasingly diverse metropolis in the late 19th century, largely due to the arrival of European immigrants

Kean University was founded in April 1855 in Newark, New Jersey as the Newark Normal School, a Saturday morning school initially established for the exclusive purpose of being a teacher-education college for the educators of the city of Newark. The university was founded by Stephen Congar, Newark's Superintendent of Schools, who founded the Newark Normal School with the goal of ensuring the continued improvement of the city's schools through quality teaching. The academy was designed to improve the skills of teachers whom Congar correctly viewed as lacking in formal training. Newark Normal School was the first Normal School created in New Jersey, and one of the earliest in the nation, with an inaugural class of 85 students, mostly women and primarily Newark High School alumni.

Most of the college's first students were white, middle class, Protestants. Classes continued during the Civil War, but the numbers of men enrolled declined as young men joined the Union Army. Following the Union victory in the war, increasing numbers of Catholics, largely the children of immigrants, began to enroll beginning the school's theme of a diverse student body that would continue to evolve over the next 150 years; by 1911 the children of immigrants exceeded thirty percent of the student body; since that time, Kean University has become one of the nation's most diverse schools. In 1863 the Normal School students became formally required to teach in Newark Public Schools after graduation. In 1879 the Normal School program was extended to one year, and in 1888 to two years. The first classes of the Normal School met at Newark High School, then located on Washington and Linden Streets in Newark. In 1878, the Normal School moved to the Market Street School for about two decades before moving back to Newark High School in 1899. In 1898 the curriculum of the college was radically revised in an effort to have teachers "professionalized" and enhance the status of the institution.

=== New Jersey State Normal School ===
In 1913 the state took control of the college and the School was renamed the New Jersey State Normal School at Newark. The school moved to a new building at Fourth Street and Belleville Avenue (later Broadway Avenue) that year. In 1917, during World War I, the Normal School faculty and students worked in war-related fundraising and relief efforts.

In the following decade the normal school raised its standards further, as evidenced by a 1925 announcement that "students who are deficient in spelling...will be dropped from the school" and by the 1928 extension of the normal school program to three years. The Great Depression brought challenges for the school as enrollment and the overall number of teachers hired in New Jersey declined sharply. In 1934 a great milestone was reached when the normal school became a four-year college and the State Board of Education authorized it School to grant a bachelor's degrees, a Bachelor of Science in education.

=== New Jersey State Teachers College ===
In 1937 the college was renamed the New Jersey State Teachers College at Newark and remained in the Broadway building until 1958, when it moved to the current Union Township, New Jersey campus.

==== Impact of World War II ====
World War II brought sweeping changes to the college with some 300 students serving in the armed forces and seven Newark State students losing their lives on active duty. During the war, President Roy L. Shaffer pledged to keep the college "rolling" as part of the "moral and intellectual defense" of the nation.

The accelerating changes during World War II altered the nature of the college as its students, faculty, and curriculum became more diverse, the campus underwent physical changes, and the student body changed dramatically. One young veteran, writing home from occupied Germany, predicted that the college would see a lot more men's faces after the war, which turned out to be very accurate; the education benefits offered under the GI Bill of Rights drove men to apply at unprecedented levels, including more African-American students.

As the post-war Baby Boom generated a large demand for new teachers, the college found itself broadening in the face of student desires for a broader curriculum that quickly expanded to encompass the liberal arts and sciences, the professions, and graduate education. While the college maintained a focus on educating teachers it was quickly developing itself into a comprehensive institution. By the early 1950s, post-war growth had severely strained the college's facilities, causing a need for a new campus.

=== Newark State College ===
The purchase of the Kean Estate in Union Township, then called the "Green Lane Farm", allowed for a new campus in 1958 at the site of the Kean family's ancestral home at Liberty Hall. The following year, in 1959, the institution changed its name to Newark State College, completing its transformation from a college of education to a comprehensive institute of higher education.

President Eugene Wilkins retired in 1969, following the successful transition of the college from Newark to Union, and the successful inaugural years of Newark State College. Wilkins was succeeded by Nathan Weiss, for whom the Nathan Weiss Graduate College is named. Weiss was committed to wide access to higher education, especially for first-generation college students, while fostering vastly expanded new programs in the sciences, health cares, business, and academic and administrative computing. Weiss led the school to its status as a multi-purpose institution.

=== Kean College of New Jersey ===
In 1973, Newark State College was renamed Kean College of New Jersey for the Kean family, whose members include U.S. Senator Robert Kean, U.S. Congressman John Kean, New Jersey Governor and 9/11 Commission chairman Thomas Kean, U.S. Senator Hamilton F. Kean, Julia Kean (the wife of U.S. Secretary of State and New York Governor Hamilton Fish), First Lady of the United States Anna Symmes Harrison, U.S. Congressman Thomas Kean Jr., and John Kean of South Carolina, a delegate to Congress under the Articles of Confederation.

Elsa Gomez became the first female president of Kean College in 1989 and served until 1994. By the 1990s the student body of Kean College was among the most diverse in New Jersey.

=== Kean University ===
Becoming Kean University of New Jersey on September 26, 1997, Kean soon added the Nathan Weiss Graduate College. In 2003, Dawood Farahi was elected president of Kean University by the unanimous vote of the board of trustees.

Kean University has grown to become the third largest institution of higher education in the State of New Jersey, after Rutgers University and Montclair State University. In recent years, besides its campuses in Union and Hillside, New Jersey, the university has recently completed additional expansions to Toms River, New Jersey, which houses an Ocean County satellite campus, as well as the People's Republic of China. In 2006, the university announced that it was seeking approval from the Chinese and U.S. educational governing bodies to be the first American university to open an extensive University campus on Chinese soil. The new campus is located in Wenzhou, Zhejiang Province, one of the richest, fastest growing Chinese provinces. The Chinese campus has a growing student body.

In 2009, the administration unveiled a major reorganization plan touted as the "first step" in privatizing the university. Faculty reacted negatively to the plan, including a 2010 vote of no confidence. One year later, the university's president, Dawood Farahi came under scrutiny from the Kean Federation of Teachers leadership who accused him of multiple errors on his resumes.

After hiring an independent law firm to review Farahi's resume, the Board of Trustees of Kean University voted 7-4 with one abstention to retain him as president of the university. The following year, in April 2012, the NCAA accused the university of "major violations" and placed all of its sports teams on probation. This turmoil attracted the attention of the university's regional accreditor who initially demanded answers from the university in 2011 and briefly placed the university on probation in 2012.

On May 11, 2020, Lamont Repollet was selected as the 18th president of Kean University by the Kean University Board of Trustees.

== Academics and research ==
Academic rankings

National
- Forbes: 424
- U.S. News & World Report: 315 (tie)
- Washington Monthly: 162

=== Rankings ===
In 2024, U.S. News & World Report ranked Kean University tied for No.315 out of 436 National Universities, tied for No.170 out of 225 in Top Public Schools, tied for No.392 out of 686 in Nursing, and tied for No.61 out of 433 in Top Performers on Social Mobility.

In 2024, Forbes America's Top Colleges ranked Kean University 424th among 500 national universities in the U.S. based on return on investment, average student debt levels and outcomes for their graduates.

In 2024, Washington Monthly ranked Kean University 162nd among 438 national universities in the U.S. based on Kean's contribution to the public good, as measured by social mobility, research, and promoting public service.

=== Undergraduate admissions ===
In 2024, Kean University accepted 82.6% of undergraduate applicants, with admission standards considered easy, applicant competition considered very low, and with those enrolled having an average 3.2 high school GPA. The college does not require submission of standardized test scores, Kean University being a test optional school. Those enrolled that submitted test scores had an average 1030 SAT score (13% submitting scores) or an average 20 ACT score (1% submitting scores).

=== Colleges and schools ===
Kean University offers 50+ undergraduate programs, 70+ doctoral, master's and certificate programs, and 23 online programs in its six colleges:

- The College of Business and Public Management
- The College of Education
- The College of Liberal Arts
- The Dorothy and George Hennings College of Science, Mathematics and Technology
- Michael Graves College, Architecture and Design
- The College of Health Professions and Human Services

=== Dual-degree programs ===
Kean University offers dual-degree programs with several universities, including Rutgers University, Fairleigh Dickinson University, and Howard University.

=== Research institutions ===
Kean hosts research institutions including the Kean University Holocaust Resource Center, the New Jersey Center for Science, Technology and Mathematics (NJ STEM), the Kean University Human Rights Institute, and the Liberty Hall Museum National Historic Landmark.

== Campuses ==
=== Kean USA ===
==== Main Campus ====
Kean's Main Campus (121.5 acres (0.492 km^{2})) is located in Union, New Jersey and contains most of the university's buildings and institutions. All resident students reside on the Main Campus.

==== Liberty Hall Campus ====
The Liberty Hall Campus (28.5 acres (115,000 m^{2})) is also in Union Township, across Morris Avenue from the main campus.

==== East Campus ====
The East Campus (35.4 acres (143,000 m^{2})) is located in Hillside, New Jersey, in the former Pingry School campus adjacent to the Liberty Hall campus. It hosts Nathan Weiss East Campus, as well as additional athletic fields, the East Campus Gym, Jacqueline Towns Court, Enlow Recital Hall, the College of Health Professions and Human Services, a self-serve cafe, the President's House, and the Ruth Horowitz Alumni House. Several NBA teams have practiced at Jacqueline Towns Court, including the Minnesota Timberwolves, Milwaukee Bucks, and more.

==== Kean Ocean ====
A campus in Toms River, New Jersey, called Kean Ocean is currently in operation and is temporarily housed at Ocean County College until the new campus is built. The new building is called the Gateway building which opened in December 2012.

==== Kean Skylands ====
The Skylands Campus is the newest addition of the Kean University expansions. It is located in the Oak Ridge section of Jefferson, New Jersey, an hour's drive from the main campus.

==== Kean Jersey City ====
In early 2025, Kean University submitted a proposal to execute a merger with New Jersey City University in Jersey City. On Wednesday, March 5, the NJCU Board of Trustees voted to authorize the NJCU president to pursue a letter of intent. After the completion of the merger on July 1, 2026, the Jersey City campus was renamed Kean Jersey City.

=== Wenzhou-Kean University ===
Kean University began construction on a campus in Wenzhou, in Zhejiang Province, China in 2007 and was formally established on March 31, 2014. Wenzhou-Kean University (WKU) is China's first and only full-scale American-style university, but the plans became caught up in red tape in the Beijing government. In 2012, the issues were resolved and Kean officials traveled to China to break ground on this joint venture. In 2016, the first students from Wenzhou-Kean University graduated.

The campus sits on 500 acres and has won several rewards for its integration of American and Chinese layout and architecture. Classes are in English and over 120 degree programs are offered. Students of Kean USA have the option to spend up to a year studying at WKU for no additional tuition cost with compensated airfare. In 2023, the campus student population was 4,500 students and is on track to have 7,000 students on campus by 2025.

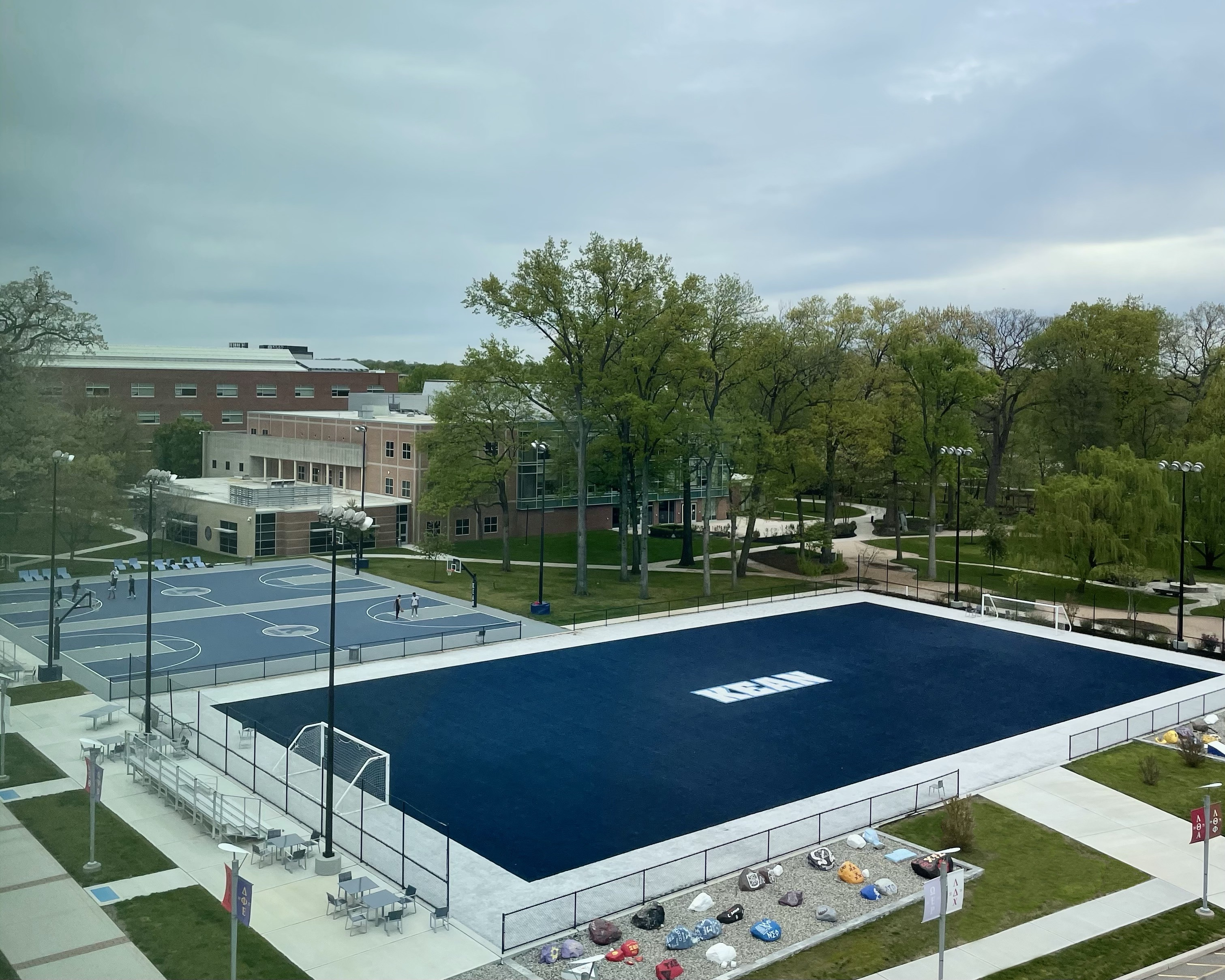
Miron Student Center Recreation Area

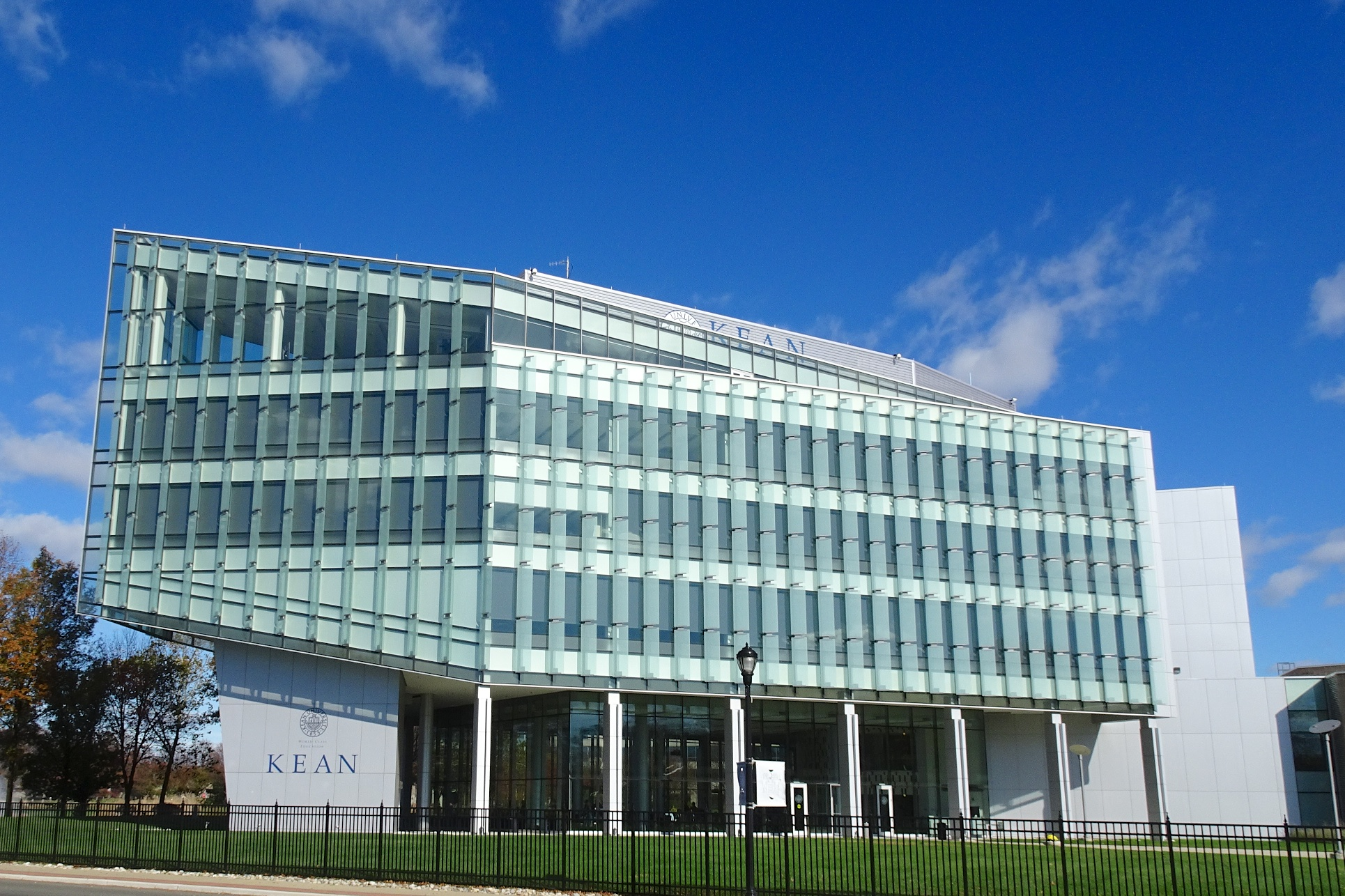
New Jersey Center for Science, Technology and Mathematics, known as the STEM building

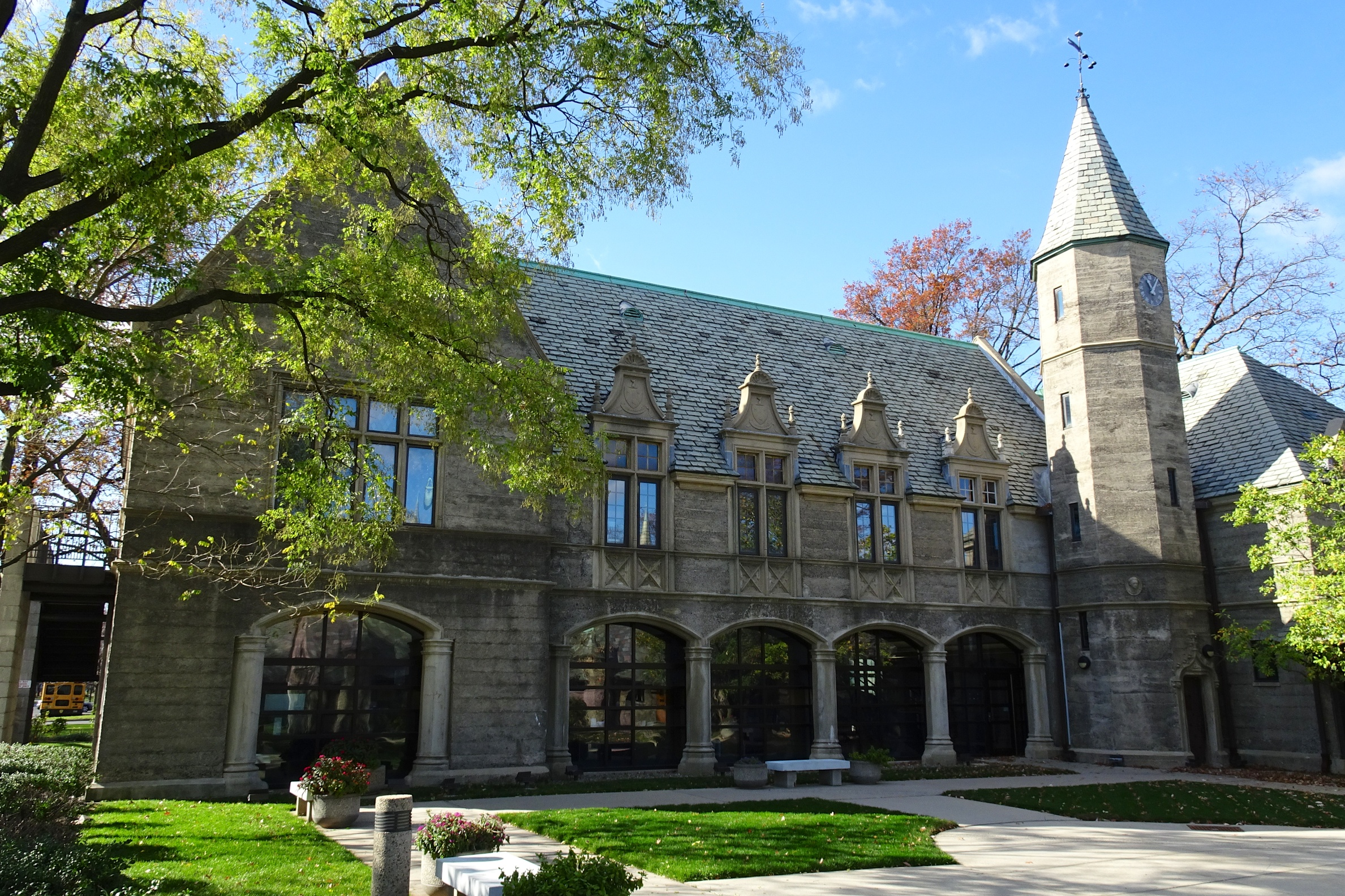
Kean Hall located on its Main Campus in Union, NJ

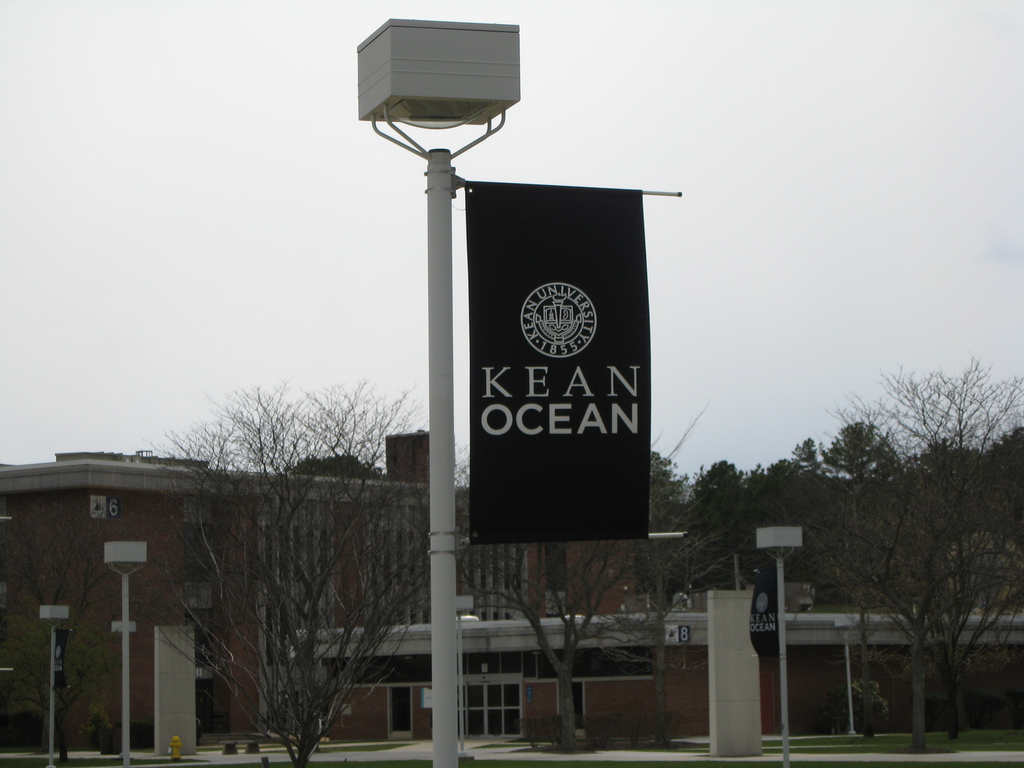
Kean has opened a satellite campus in Toms River, New Jersey, in addition to its main campus in Union Township

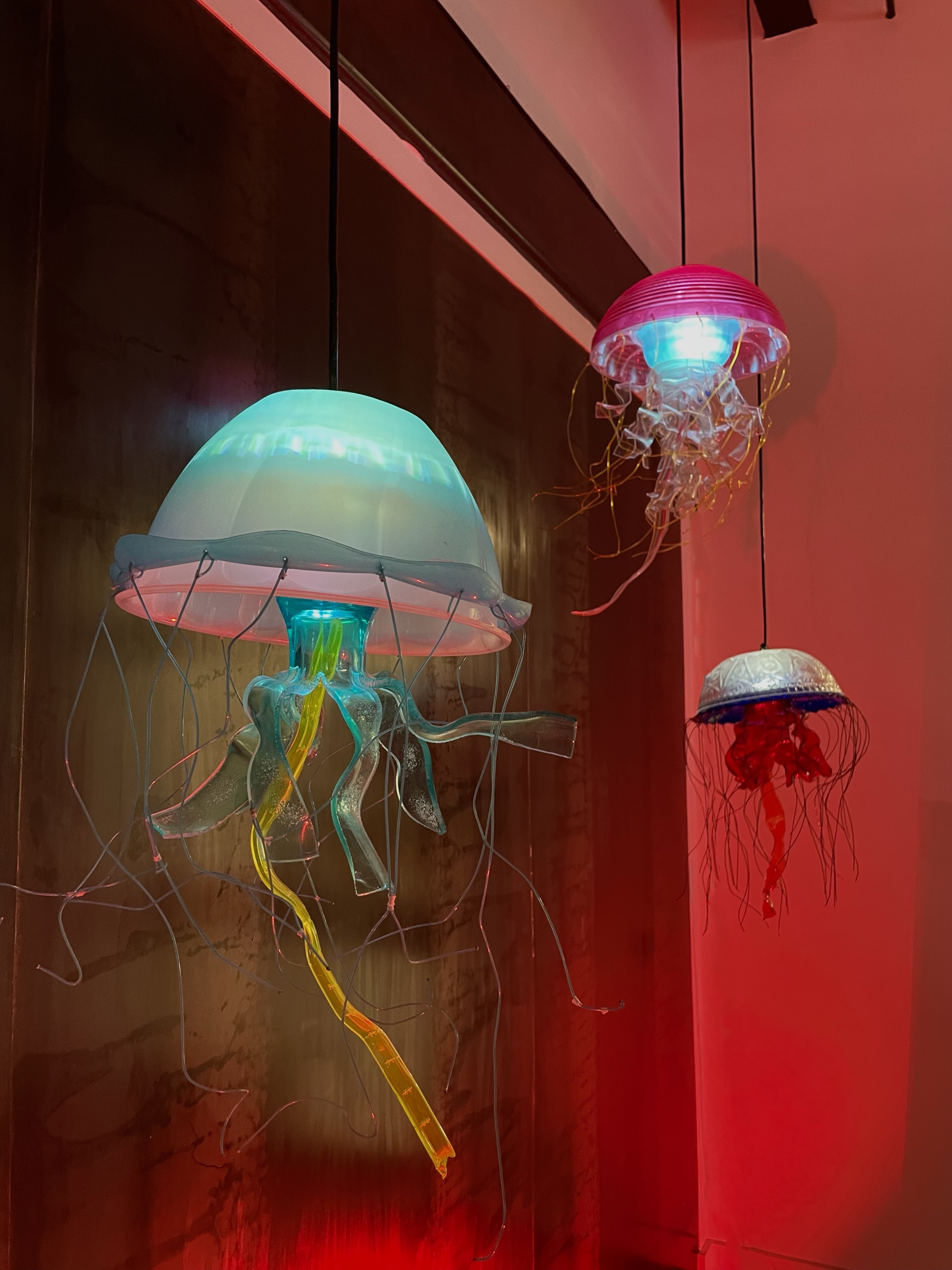
An exhibit from Sayaka Ganz at the Liberty Hall

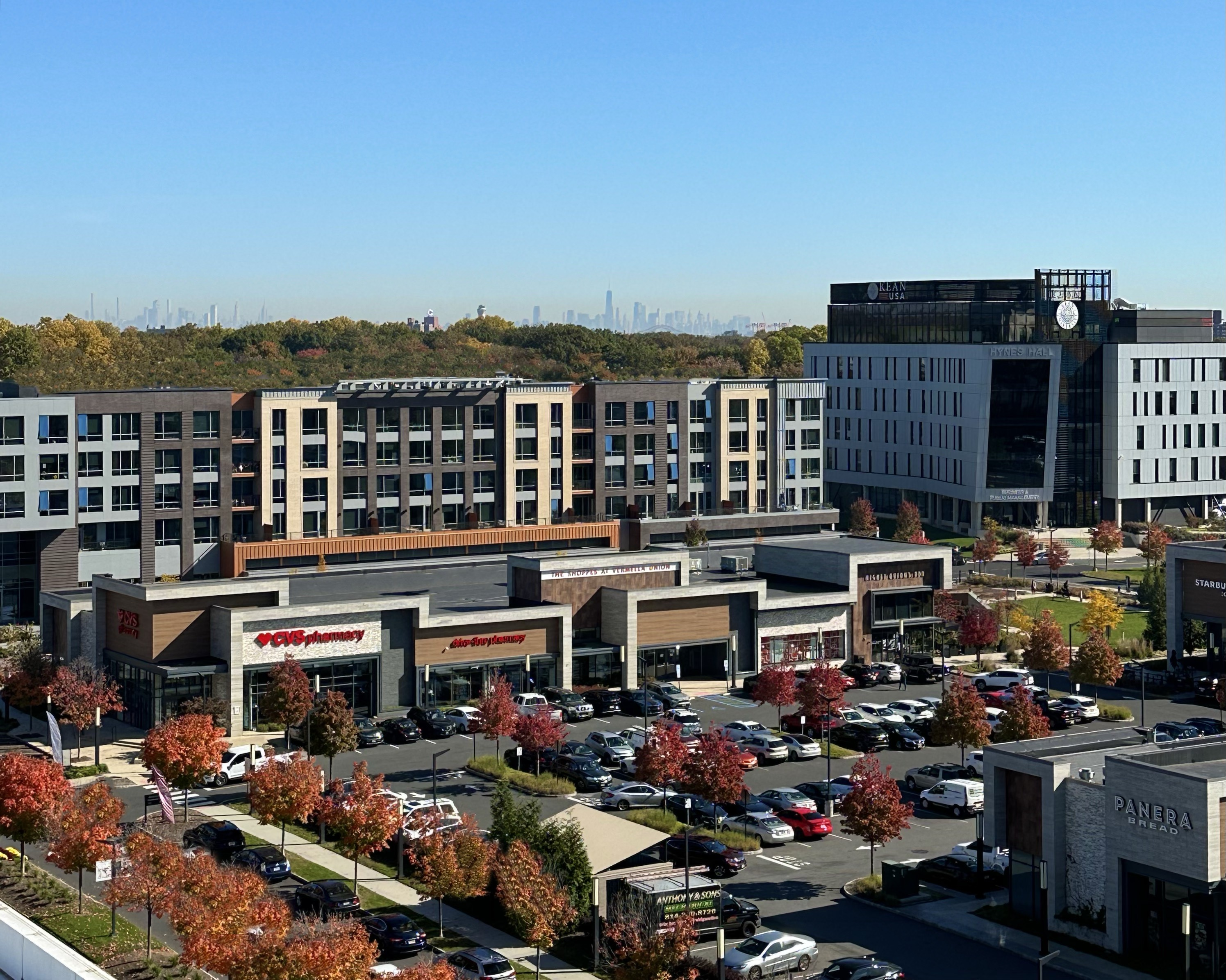
The Shoppes at Vermella and Hynes Hall with Newark International Airport and the New York City skyline in the background

== Demographics ==
Undergraduate demographics as of Fall 2023
Race and ethnicity	Total
Hispanic	37%
White	25%
Black	20%
International student	6%
Asian	5%
Unknown	4%
Two or more races	2%
Economic diversity
Low-income (Note: The percentage of students who received an income-based federal Pell grant intended for low-income students.)	80%
Affluent (Note: The percentage of students who are a part of the American middle class at the bare minimum.)	52%

Kean University CDP
- Census-designated place
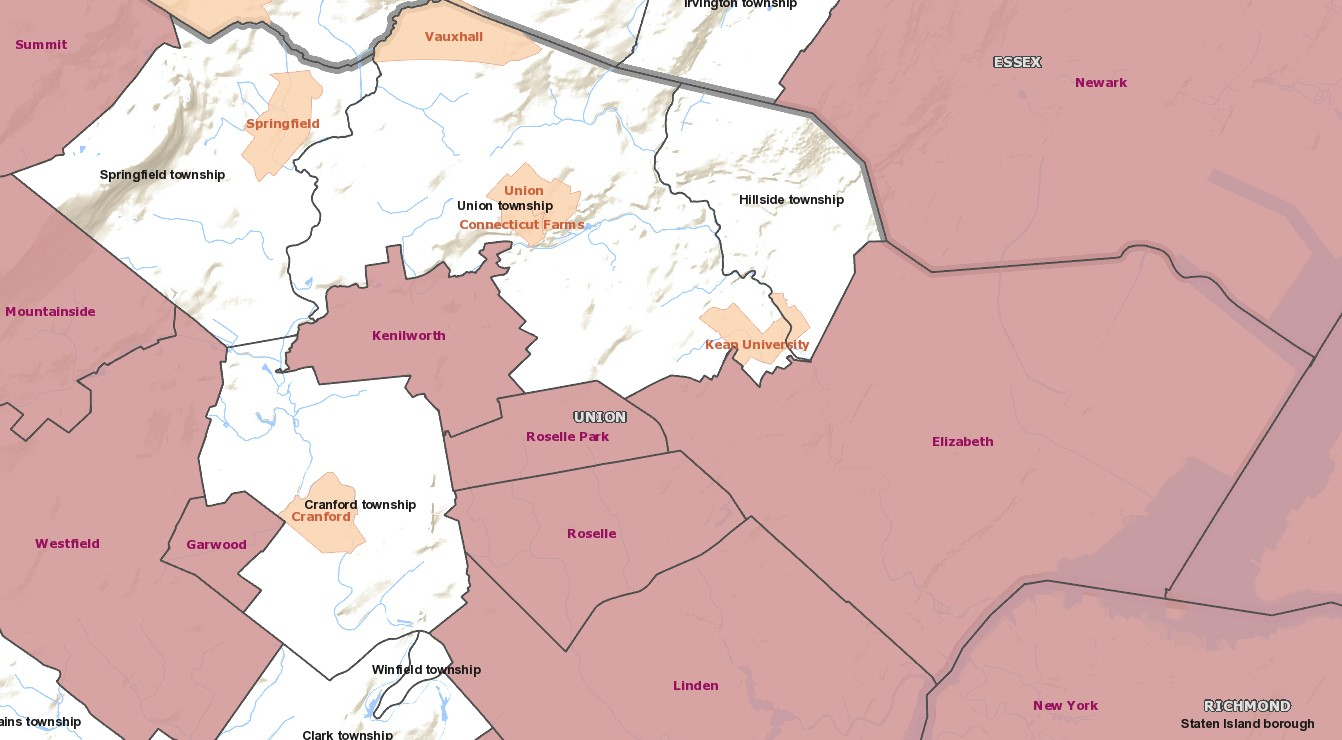

- Location of Kean University in Union County Location in New Jersey Location in the United States
- Coordinates: 40.6790154°N 74.2314660°W
- Country: United States
- State: New Jersey
- County: Union

Area
  - Total: 0.30 sq mi (0.77 km^{2})
  - Land: 0.29 sq mi (0.76 km^{2})
  - Water: 0.0039 sq mi (0.01 km^{2})
- Elevation: 43 ft (13 m)

Population (2020)
  - Total: 1,522
  - Density: 5,211.0/sq mi (2,011.96/km^{2})
- Time zone: UTC−05:00 (Eastern (EST))
  - Summer (DST): UTC−04:00 (Eastern (EDT))
- FIPS code: 34-36484
- GNIS feature ID: 2806105
- Website: www.kean.edu

Kean University is a census-designated place (CDP) covering the residential population of Kean University's Main, Liberty Hall, and East campuses in Hillside Township and Union Township in Union County.

It first appeared as a CDP in the 2020 census, and reported a population of 1,522. The CDP population consists of those resident at the time of the census and will differ from the population of the student body.

Historical population
Census	Pop.	Note	%±
2020	1,522		—
U.S. Decennial Census; 2020

=== 2020 census ===
Kean University CDP, New Jersey – Racial and ethnic composition Note: the US Census treats Hispanic/Latino as an ethnic category. This table excludes Latinos from the racial categories and assigns them to a separate category. Hispanics/Latinos may be of any race.
Race / Ethnicity (NH = Non-Hispanic)	Pop 2020	% 2020
White alone (NH)	534	35.09%
Black or African American alone (NH)	614	40.34%
Native American or Alaska Native alone (NH)	2	0.13%
Asian alone (NH)	59	3.88%
Native Hawaiian or Pacific Islander alone (NH)	0	0.00%
Other race alone (NH)	8	0.53%
Mixed race or Multiracial (NH)	25	1.64%
Hispanic or Latino (any race)	280	18.40%
Total	1,522	100.00%

== Performing and visual arts at Kean ==
=== Premiere Stages ===
Kean is the home of Premiere Stages, a professional theatre company that works with Kean students in the production of its plays. Its Premiere Play Festival is an annual new play competition. Kean Stage brings the performing arts to students and the community. The Jazz & Roots Music Festival launched in 2021 on the Lawn at Enlow Hall.

=== The Galleries at Kean University ===
Kean also offers a variety of art galleries across campus. Galleries are open to the public and mostly have free admission. The Galleries showcase student work, globally recognized artists, and organized collections from National Geographic, the American Museum of Natural History, and more. The galleries are located on Kean USA's Main Campus and Liberty Hall Campus.

== Greek life and student organizations ==
=== Greek life ===
There are several fraternities and sororities available to students.

=== Student Government Association ===
The Student Government Association of Kean University is the full-time undergraduate governing body of Kean University. This student government provides programs for students to address student concerns about the university. They also provide funding to over 300 recognized student groups.

== Athletics ==
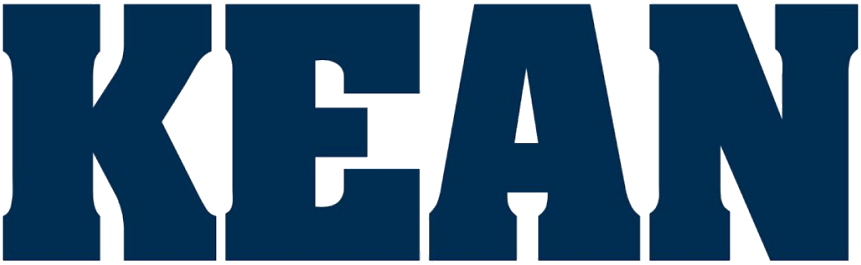
Kean athletics wordmark

The university's athletic teams are known as the Cougars and the school colors are Kean Blue and light blue. Kean competes at the NCAA Division III level in 14 sports as a member of the New Jersey Athletic Conference (NJAC) for most sports while men's volleyball competes as a member of the Continental Volleyball Conference (CVC) and men's lacrosse competes in the Coastal Lacrosse Conference (CLC).

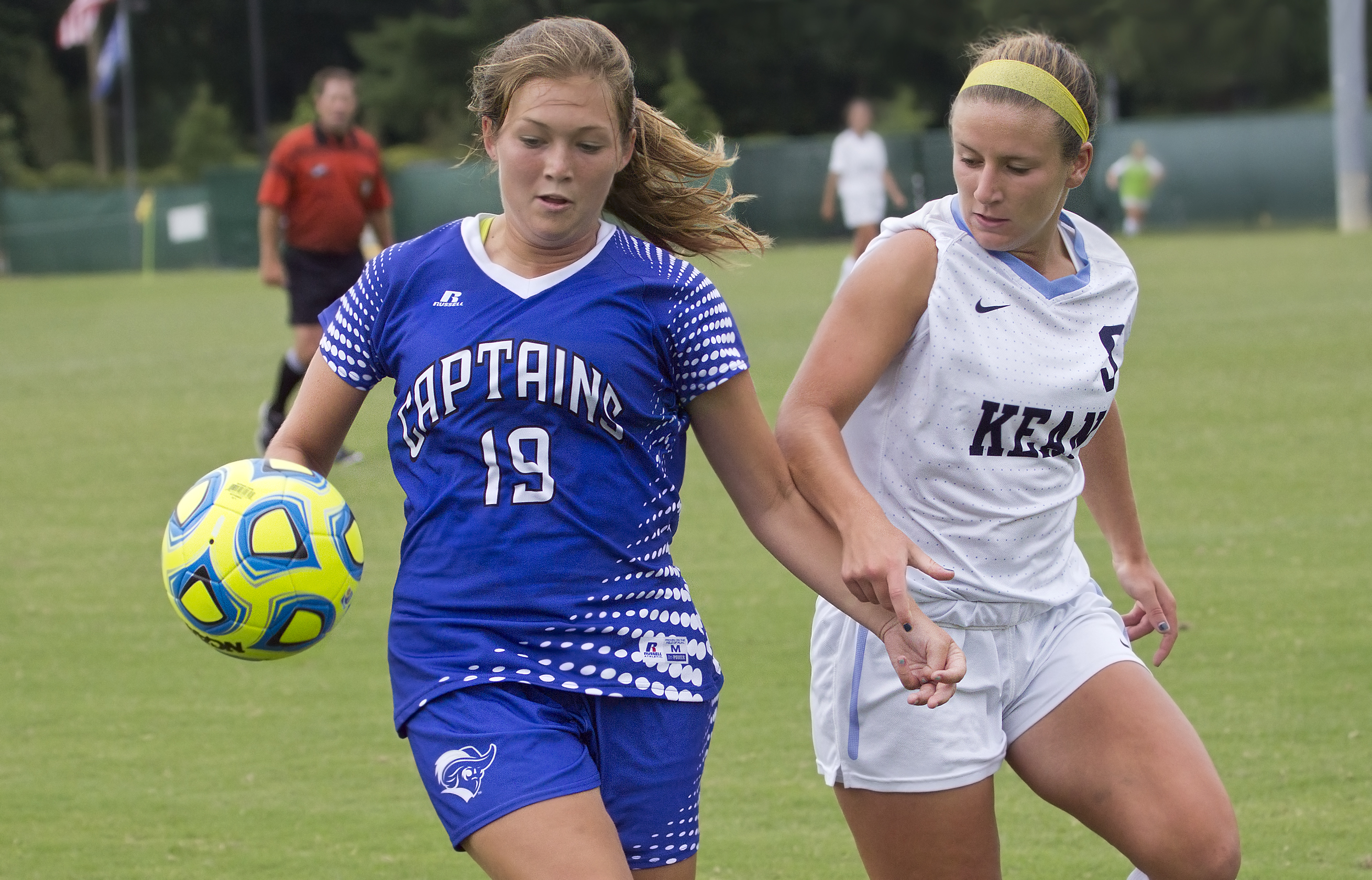
Kean (in white) v CNU, women's soccer match in 2014

On May 29, 2007, Kean University won their first Division III College World Series, winning the national title in baseball. In 2011, the NCAA alleged that the university had committed several violations of NCAA rules. Consequently, the university instituted a self-imposed ban on post-season play for Fall 2011 for the men's soccer, women's soccer, and women's volleyball teams.

Men's sports	Women's sports
Baseball	Basketball
Basketball	Cross Country
Cross Country	Field hockey
Football	Golf
Golf	Lacrosse
Lacrosse	Track and field
Track and field	Soccer
Soccer	Softball
Volleyball	Swimming
	Tennis
	Volleyball
Co-ed sports
e-sports

In April 2012, the NCAA concluded that "major violations" had occurred, and that all 13 varsity athletic teams would be on probation until April 2016, that the women's basketball team would be banned from post-season play in 2013. The NCAA also mandated that all records for the 2010-11 women's basketball team be vacated.

=== Kean Alumni Stadium ===
Located on the main campus, Kean Alumni Stadium is a multipurpose athletic facility that serves as home for the university's football, field hockey, men's and women's soccer, men's and women's lacrosse, and men's and women's track and field teams. With NYC and NJ being selected as the host city for the 2026 FIFA World Cup, Alumni Stadium and other Kean facilities will be used as practice and training facilities.

=== Harwood Arena ===
The Harwood Arena opened in 2006. It features a basketball court, indoor track, and bleacher seating for 3,200.

=== Clubs ===
In addition to athletics, Kean University has a variety of clubs and organizations, all ran by students. Kean University already offers over 300 recognized student groups.
