= Dawood Farahi =

President of Kean University
- In office July 1, 2003 – May 2020
- Preceded by: Frank J. Esposito (interim)

Personal details
- Born: Afghanistan
- Education: University of Kansas (PhD)

Dawood Farahi is an Afghan-American academic administrator who served as president of Kean University from July 1, 2003 to May 2020.

== Early life and education ==
Farahi was born and raised in Afghanistan. He relocated to the United States to with limited English skills to earn his PhD, studying at the University of Kansas as a Fulbright Scholar.

== Career ==
Farahi began his career at Kean University as a professor in the public administration program. Since joining Kean, questions have been raised about the validity of Farahi's resume. Faculty members at Kean have stated that Farahi's resumes have included "erroneous claims of publication and other misleading statements." After an investigation was launched in 2012, the university's board of trustees voted to retain Farahi by a vote of 7–4.

During Farahi's tenure, the university has also struggled with maintaining accreditation. In July 2012, the university was placed on probation by the Middle States Commission on Higher Education for failing to meet academic standards. In August 2018, it was announced that the public administration master's program would lose its accreditation at the start of the fall semester.

In August 2019, it was announced that Farahi would retire at the end of the 2019–2020 academic year.
