= Orna Ben-Ami =

Israeli sculptor and journalist (born 1953)

Orna Ben-Ami אורנה בן-עמי
- Born: 1953 (age 72–73)
- Known for: Sculptor
- Spouse: Oded Ben-Ami
- Website: http://www.ornabenami.com/

Orna Ben-Ami (Hebrew: אורנה בן-עמי; born in 1953) is an Israeli sculptor and former journalist.

== Early life ==
Ben-Ami was born in Rehovot and was raised in Ashdod, Israel.

In 1971, she joined the service at IDF and became the first female military correspondent for the Army Radio station "Gallei Zahal". Following her military service, she became a reporter and news editor for the Israeli Broadcasting Authority radio station.

== Career ==
In 1998, Ben-Ami began to learn gold and silversmith at the Jerusalem Technological Center. She continued her studies in 1992 and enrolled in the Corcoran School of Art in Washington, D.C. where she studied sculpting.

In 2003, her exhibition, "Soft – Iron Sculpturing", was presented in seven museums around the United States, a museum in Taiwan and galleries in Paris and Rome. In 2005, she sculpted "Roots", which represented Israel in an international exhibition honouring 60 years of the United Nations in Geneva.

In 2017, her exhibition was hosted at United Nations headquarters in Geneva and New York City, under the title "Entire Life in a Package". The exhibition brought attention to the global refugee crisis. The exhibits were a combination of original "Reuters" photographs of refugees and iron sculpting.

Ben-Ami is married to Israeli journalist and broadcaster Oded Ben-Ami.

== Selected solo exhibitions ==
- 2025 – American University Katzen Arts Center, Washington, DC
- 2019 – Babs Gallery, Milano, Italy
- 2019 – Dannos Museum, Traverse City, Michigan
- 2018 – Archivio di Stato, Torino, Italy
- 2018 – Casa Romei, Ferrar, Italy
- 2018 – Instituto Superiore Per la Consevazione ed il Restauro, Matera Italy
- 2018 – Museum of Villa Aurea, Parco della Valle dei Templi, Agrigento, Sicily, Italy
- 2017 – Museum Vila zanders, Bergisch Gladbach, Germany
- 2017 – Palace of Nations – UN – Geneva
- 2017 – Waterfall Mansion Gallery, New York City
- 2017 – UN Headquarter, New York City
- 2015 – The Art Gallery of the Bolsa, Mexico City, Mexico
- 2015 – The Museum of the City of Metepec, Mexico
- 2015 – La Biblioteca De Mexico, Mexico's National Library, Mexico City, Mexico
- 2015 – Gallery Miguel Hidalgo, Torre del Reloj, Mexico City, Mexico, Mexico
- 2015 – Mexico's Parliament, Mexico City, Mexico
- 2014 – Hangar 2 Jaffa Port, Tel Aviv – Jaffa, Israel
- 2013 – The Office Gallery, Tel Aviv, Israel
- 2011/12 – The Museum Tour, Tel Aviv, Israel
- 2010 – Yigal Alon Center, Israel
- 2009 – Marshall M. Fredericks Sculpture Museum, Michigan
- 2009 – Hickory Museum of Art, Hickory, North Carolina
- 2008 – The City Gallery at Waterfront Park, Charleston, South Carolina
- 2007 – Washington University Medical School, St. Louis, Missouri
- 2006 – The Yeshiva University Museum, New York City
- 2006 – Gallery Claude Samuel, Paris, France
- 2006 – International Arts and Artists, Washington DC
- 2004/05 – Tefen Open Museum
- 2004 – Kimball Art Center, Park City, Utah
- 2003 – Café Europa, Center of Contemporary Art and Dante Alighieri, Rome, Italy
- 2002 – Bet Gabriel, Jordan Valley
- 2001 – Wilfrid Israel Museum, Kibbutz Hazorea
- 2001 – The Museum of Contemporary Israeli Art, Ramat Gan
- 1998 – Tel Aviv Amot House

== Selected group exhibitions ==
- 2016 – Waterfall Mansion and Gallery, New York, NY
- 2015 – The Supreme Court, Jerusalem, Israel
- 2014 – Artists House, Haifa, Israel
- 2014 – Zimach Gallery, Tel Aviv, Israel
- 2011 – Hualien Stone Sculpture Museum, Taiwan
- 2009– Ashdod museum of Art, curator-Yona Fisher
- 2005– Geneva, Switzerland. Representing Israel in the UN Contemporary International Art Exhibition
- 2004 – Arad Museum of Art
- 2003 – Ashdod Museum of Art
- 2002 – Ein Hod Gallery
- 2001 – The Supreme Court, Tel Aviv
- 1999 – Tel Aviv Opera House
- 1998 to 2004 – six exhibitions in Beit Hagefen, Haifa, Israel
- 1998 – The State President's Residence, Jerusalem.

== Selected commissions and public sculptures ==
- 2018 - Duet, Herzelia, Israel
- 2017 - Follow Me, Margaliot, Israel
- 2016 – Support, Ganei Tikva, Israel
- 2016 – "Key to Friendship", Bergisch Gladbach, Germany
- 2016 – "Friendship". Ganei Tikva, Israel
- 2015 – "Sitting in the Shade", Ganei Tikva
- 2014 – "Hadar", Raanana
- 2013 – "The chairman", Rishon Lezion
- 2011 – "A portrait of the Poet", Kiriat Ono
- 2010 – "Nature", Tel Aviv
- 2008 – "Living Together" – Ganie Tikva, Israel
- 2007– "Memories"- Tefen Open Museum, Sculpture Garden, Israel
- 2007– "Dudu" – Kiriat Shmona, Israel
- 2007– "Personal"- Sculpture Garden, Ramat hasharon, Israel
- 2007– "Roots"- Tefen Open Museum, Israel
- 2005 -"Life Stories" 13 wall sculptures for Apartment Buildings, Tel Aviv
- 2005 -"Time stopped"' Raanana, Israel
- 2004 – "Ideology – Sixs sculptures for Menahem Begin Museum, Jerusalem
- 2003 – "Tradition", Ramat Gan, Israel
- 2003 – "Four Months Pregnant", Ganei Tikva, Israel
- 2002 – "Yossef", IBM Building, Haifa, Israel
- 2002 – " Omer", Kefar Sabba, Israel
- 2001 – "Grandma's Patchwork", copper, wood, Safed, Israel
- 2001 – "Jerusalemites", 11 sculptures the Central Bus Station, Jerusalem.
- 2001 – "Time To Remember", Kefar Shmariahu, Israel
- 2000 – "Outside In", iron, Rabin Medical Center, Petach Tikva, Israel
- 1999 – "Ball in Motion", iron, Ashdod, Israel
- 1998 – "Episode", iron, Arad, Israel
- 1997 – "Embracing the World", bronze, Safed, Israel
- 1997 – "Support", iron, Ashkelon, Israel
- 1996 – "Harmony of steel and glass", Zipory, Israel
- 1995 – "Born Free", iron, Ramat Hasharon, Israel
- 1995 – "Expecting", bronze, Shiba Medical Center, Tel Aviv
