= Sayaka Ganz =

Japanese sculptor

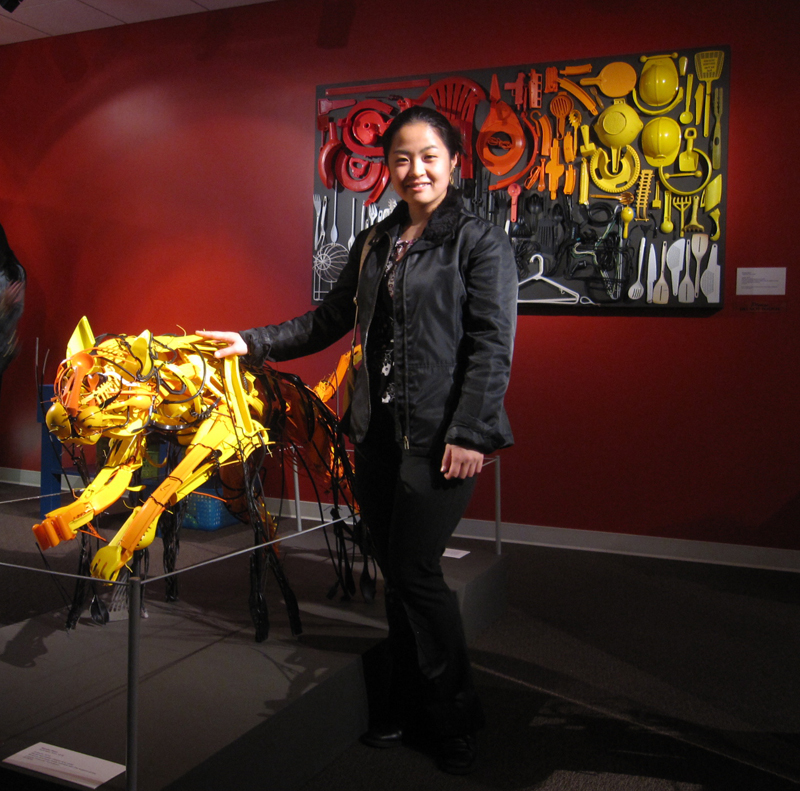
- Ganz used the duplicate parts from Ambush to create the wall relief Jungle Sunset.
- Born: Sayaka Ganz; Yokohama, Japan
- Education: Indiana University Bloomington
- Known for: Sculpting

Sayaka Ganz is a Japanese sculptor. Her works incorporate reclaimed plastic as a medium. She was born in Yokohama, Japan and grew up living in Japan, Brazil, and Hong Kong. Ganz identifies a strong Japanese influence in her work, even though she grew up in several countries.

During her BFA studies at Indiana University Bloomington she explored various media, from ceramics to printmaking, before determining sculpture and welding as her expressive vehicles of choice. She met and married her husband Christopher Ganz, an artist and professor in printmaking, during her time in Bloomington. Between 2002 and 2012 she taught design and drawing courses at Indiana University-Purdue University Fort Wayne (IPFW). She has been living and working in Indiana for over 15 years.

== Personal background and philosophy ==
Ganz spent her early childhood in Japan, but grew up in several countries. Ganz's family moved to São Paulo, Brazil when she was nine years old and lived there for almost five years. At the age of 13, her family moved back to Japan, and then moved to Hong Kong. Soon after, Ganz came to the United States to attend university. Up to high school Ganz never graduated from the same school she started in. Constant moving had a great impact on her way of thinking, and in turn allowed her to be more flexible, yet crave a sense of belonging.

Raised on Japanese Shinto beliefs, she was taught that all objects and organisms have spirits, and objects that are discarded before their time weep at night inside the trash bin. This imagery became very prominent in her growth. The constant need to adjust to a new environment also gave Ganz a strong desire to fit in and to create harmony in her life.

Ganz believes it is very difficult to think far into the future in terms of our ecological footprint. There are no guarantees in the future, and any predictions are often wrong. Ganz does not condemn the use of plastic or the human desire for a more convenient and easier life. She believes an artist's strength lies in their ability to show how beautiful these materials can be, and what can be done with them.

== Work ==
Using reclaimed plastic household objects as her materials, Ganz's recent sculptures depict animals in motion. Ganz collects most of her working material from dustbins and charity shops, and the rest is donated by friends and family. Ganz uses various forms of discarded plastic, from cutlery to sunglasses and baskets, and sorts them into many colour groups. Then she ties every piece of plastic to a wire armature, until she achieves the shape she first envisioned. Ganz's works range from 18 inches to 8 feet long and the most complicated ones take up to a month to finish and can contain hundreds of pieces.

Her exhibitions include: Objects and Spirits, a solo exhibition at the Robert E. Wilson Gallery, Huntington University, Huntington, IN, and Convergence, a solo exhibition in the Visual Arts Gallery, Indiana University-Purdue University Fort Wayne.

Her sculpture Ambush has been installed permanently in the educational wing of the Fort Wayne Museum of Art. In 2012 she completed a commission for a series of four marine life sculptures for the Monterey Bay Aquarium in California.

Ganz's work is collected and exhibited in London, Tokyo, Takaoka, Isle of Man, New York, San Francisco, Monterey, Toledo and Fort Wayne.
