= Kean University Human Rights Institute =

Academic institute in Union, New Jersey

The Kean University Human Rights Institute, located on the main campus of Kean University in Union, New Jersey, is an educational, advocacy, and research institute whose mission is to raise awareness of human rights violations across the globe and to create initiatives to battle human rights abuses and produce curricula, material, and seminars that promote tolerance. In May 2010 the Human Rights Institute was formally opened by Kerry Kennedy, co-founder of the Robert F. Kennedy Center for Human Rights, though the institute's work preceded the formal opening. The institute has hosted annual high-profile conferences on human rights since 2008. The institute's work is recognized as a major regional and national resource for developing curricula, seminars, and other materials designed to promote tolerance and understanding, break barriers, and inspire people to take action on behalf of human rights.

== Founding and mission ==
The Human Rights Institute at Kean University was designed to broaden the university's longstanding efforts to promote awareness of human rights issues and violations worldwide and to develop initiatives designed to help eradicate these abuses and their root causes. Billed as a "call to action", the institute aims to teach, to educate, and to act on behalf of human rights. In 2008 the institute began hosting its annual international conference on human rights and in 2010 the Human Rights Institute formally opened in a new building adjacent to the Nancy Thompson Library. The new institute's gallery highlights issues, publications, and artwork related to human rights worldwide. The facility's architects received the Design Honor Award from the New Jersey Chapter of the American Institute of Architects for their work on the institute.

The institute dedication ceremony featured Kerry Kennedy, daughter of the late U.S. Senator and U.S. Attorney General Robert F. Kennedy and Ethel Kennedy and niece of President John F. Kennedy and Senator Edward Kennedy. Kerry Kennedy had co-founded the Robert F. Kennedy Center for Justice and Human Rights, one of the world's leading advocacy centers for ongoing education related to human rights issues and individual empowerment. The gallery's first exhibit, "Speak Truth to Power", was Kerry Kennedy's and featured photographs of individual human rights champions from around the globe whom Kennedy personally interviewed for her publication "Speak Truth to Power".

Kean's Holocaust Resource Center, established in 1982, and Liberty Hall, founded in the eighteenth century at the dawn of the American Revolution by William Livingston, predate the institute in the fight for human rights at Kean and the institute has stated an intent to build on the Kean tradition of promoting human rights.

== Events and activities ==
The Human Rights Institute pursues its goals through seminars, workshops, training, curricular offerings, and the development of major symposia and conferences on peace and human rights.

=== Annual Human Rights Conference ===
The Human Rights Institute's most prominent signature event is the annual international conference on human rights, the first of which was held in 2008. The first conference, Darfur: the First Genocide of the 21st Century, was headlined by two-time Pulitzer Prize-winning New York Times columnist Nicholas Kristof and former Sudanese slave Simon Deng and examined ongoing atrocities in Darfur through eyewitness accounts.

The 2009 conference, Slavery in the 21st Century, focused on the more than 27 million people enslaved in the modern world and addressed the horrors of the issue and steps to combating slavery. International founder of Free the Slaves, Dr. Kevin Bales, and former child soldier Ishmael Beah.

The 2010 conference, Combating Hatred, examined the issue and effect of hate speech and featured Morris Dees, founder of, and chief trial counsel for, the Southern Poverty Law Center.

The 2011 conference, Immigration: A Melting Pot No More? focused on the changing nature and divisive issue of immigration in modern America and featured a diverse panel of immigration experts, including former United States Ambassador to the United Nations John Bolton and New York Times columnist Lawrence Downes and was moderated by Pulitzer Prize-winning journalist Jim McQueeny.

== Student involvement ==
Kean University students have organized a Human Rights Club, based in the institute, which has participated in and organized in fundraisers, lectures, and conferences on and off campus. The club has advocated and raised funds for, among others, women in Darfur refugee camps and the Congo, child slaves and the victims of human trafficking, and the Haiti earthquake victims.

== See also ==
- Kean University
- Liberty Hall, Kean University
- New Jersey Center for Science, Technology, and Mathematics
