= Livingston (surname) =

Livingston is a surname with several different origins. The name itself originates in Scotland as a habitational name derived from Livingston in Lothian which was originally named in Middle English Levingston. This place was originally named after a man named Levin who appears in several 12th-century charters. Variations in spelling on official Scotland documents indicate phonetic spelling by non-native Scots speakers, such as Lewyngstoun 1264–1359. In Ireland (and in some cases Scotland), the name was adopted by people bearing the Gaelic surnames Ó Duinnshléibhe and Mac Duinnshléibhe. Livingston can also be an Americanized form of Lowenstein, a Jewish surname.

== Notable people ==
- Alan W. Livingston (1917–2009), American businessman, with Capitol Records
- Alex Livingston, Canadian poker player
- Alexander Livingston, 5th Lord Livingston (c. 1500 – 1553), guardian of Mary Queen of Scots
- AzMarie Livingston (born 1986), American fashion model, actress, and singer
- Barry Livingston (born 1953), American actor, known for My Three Sons
- Bob Livingston (born 1943), U.S. Congressman from Louisiana
- Bob Livingston (musician) (born 1948), American musician
- Burton Edward Livingston (1875–1948), American plant physiologist
- Charles Livingston (American football), American football coach during the 1888 season
- Charles L. Livingston (1800–1873), Speaker of the New York State Assembly in 1832 and 1833
- Chris Livingston (born 2003), American basketball player
- Christopher C. Livingston, the creator of webcomic Concerned: The Half-Life and Death of Gordon Frohman
- David Livingston, American TV producer and director, known for Star Trek
- Deborah Knox Livingston (1876–1923), Scottish-born American lecturer; temperance and suffrage activist
- Debra Ann Livingston (born 1959), Chief Judge of the United States Court of Appeals for the Second Circuit
- Denzel Livingston (born 1993), American basketball player for Hapoel Kfar Saba of the Israeli Liga Leumit
- Edward Livingston (disambiguation), several people
- Emilie Livingston (born 1983), Canadian rhythmic gymnast, dancer, aerialist and contortionist
- Flora V. Livingston (1862–1949), American librarian and bibliographer
- Guy Livingston (British Army officer) (1881–1950), British Army and Royal Air Force officer
- Henry Livingston (disambiguation), several people
- Howard G. Livingston (1907–1975), American politician
- Ian Livingston, Baron Livingston of Parkhead (born 1964), Scottish businessman
- J. Livingston (born 1957), born Philip Livingston Jones, Anglo-Indian film actor
- J. Sterling Livingston (1916–2010), American educator and management consultant
- Jacob H. Livingston (1896–1950), New York politician and judge
- James Livingston (disambiguation), several people
- Jamie Livingston (1956–1997), American photographer, film-maker and circus performer
- Jason Livingston (born 1971), British sprint athlete
- Jay Livingston (1915–2001), American songwriter
- Jessica Livingston (born 1971), American venture capitalist, writer and podcaster
- John Livingston (disambiguation), several people
- Josiah O. Livingston (1837–1917), American Civil War Medal of Honor recipient
- Kevin Livingston (born 1973), American Pro cyclist, US Nat'l Champion, Tour de France Rider
- Margaret Livingston (1895–1984), American silent film actress and businesswoman
- Mary Livingston (c. 1541 – 1571), companion of Mary Queen of Scots
- Maturin Livingston (1769–1847), New York judge
- M. Stanley Livingston (1905–1986), American accelerator physicist
- Paul Livingston (born 1956), Australian comedian
- Peter R. Livingston (politician, born 1766) (1766–1847), New York politician
- Peter Van Brugh Livingston (1710–1792), New York politician
- Philip Livingston (1716–1778), signer of the U.S. Declaration of Independence
- Philip Livingston (1686–1749), New York politician
- Randy Livingston (born 1975), American professional basketball player
- Robert Livingston (disambiguation), several people
- Ron Livingston (born 1967), American actor
- Sam Livingston (1831-1897), Canadian pioneer
- Shaun Livingston (born 1985), American professional basketball player
- Stanley Livingston (born 1950), American actor, known for My Three Sons
- Thomas Livingston (disambiguation), several people
- Walter Livingston (1740–1797), Speaker of the New York State Assembly
- Walter Livingston (1922-2011), American architect
- William Livingston (1723–1790), signer of the U.S. Constitution
- William Livingston (disambiguation), several people

== See also ==
- Livingston family
- Lord Livingston
- Livingston (disambiguation)
- Livingstone (disambiguation)
- MacDunleavy (dynasty)
- Liebenstein
- Jonathan Livingston Seagull
