= Philip Livingston (RAF officer) =

Canadian Royal Air Force officer

Sir Philip Livingston
- Born: 2 March 1893; Cowichan, Vancouver Island, Canada
- Died: 12 February 1982 (aged 88); Canada
- Military career
- Allegiance: United Kingdom
- Branch: Royal Naval Volunteer Reserve; Royal Air Force
- Service years: 1914–1951
- Rank: Air Marshal
- Commands: RAF Medical Services (1948–51)
- Conflicts: First World War; Second World War
- Awards: Knight Commander of the Order of the British Empire; Companion of the Order of the Bath; Air Force Cross

Air Marshal Sir Philip Clermont Livingston, KBE, CB, AFC, FRCS (2 March 1893 − 12 February 1982) was a physician, aviator, and a senior officer in the Royal Air Force who served as Director-General RAF Medical Services from 1948 to 1951.

== Early life and education ==
Livingston was born in Cowichan, Vancouver Island, Canada. He was the son of Clermont Livingston (1850–1907) and his second wife Mary Ann née Jarvis (1854–1935). He went to the United Kingdom after the death of his father and gained his Bachelor of Medicine at Jesus College, Cambridge, where he also gained a rowing blue in 1914. After university he joined the Royal Naval Volunteer Reserve and served from 1914 to 1919 as a surgeon probationer. In 1919 he joined the Medical Branch of the newly formed Royal Air Force (RAF) and continued his medical qualifications in public health, surgery and ophthalmology.

== RAF career ==
In 1929 Livingston was posted by the RAF to Iraq as a General Surgeon. He worked at the Baghdad Eye Hospital and gained his wings as a pilot.

As a result of a tour of German military establishments in 1937 he made recommendations for improving the flying equipment and the evaluation of RAF pilots.

In 1947 Livingston was appointed Deputy Director General of Medical Services (RAF) and promoted to Director General a year later, a post he held until his retirement in 1951.

Livingston retired to Vancouver Island where he continued to practise ophthalmology; and wrote Fringe of the Clouds, his autobiography.

== Family ==
Livingston's father, Clermont Livingston (1850–1907), was a great-grandson of Henry Brockholst Livingston and a brother of Edwin Brockholst Livingston. He first married in 1874 Mary Ellen née Clark (1842–1890) with whom he had three sons and three daughters. Clermont was a ship insurance broker. Shortly after Mary Ellen's death he met and married Mary Ann Jarvis (Note: She was the daughter of a thatcher from Essex who worked in London as a servant, the 5 April 1891 census shows Clermont with his surviving children and Mary Ann as lodgers in a Brighton Boarding house. They married on 1 June 1891.) They then moved to Cowichan in 1892 where Clermont was sent out by the Tyee Copper Company of London to manage the Tyee copper mine on Mount Sicker and a smelter
