= Livingston =

Livingston or Livingstone may refer to:

== Businesses ==
- Livingston Energy Flight, an Italian airline (2003–2010)
- Livingston Compagnia Aerea, an Italian airline (2011–2014), also known as Livingston Airline
- Livingston International, a North American customs broker
- Livingston Recording Studios, a recording studio in North London UK
- The Livingston Group, an American lobbying firm
- Livingston Enterprise, an American newspaper published in Montana since 1883
- Livingston Enterprises, an American computer networking company (1986-1997)

== Education ==
- Livingston Campus (Rutgers University), a sub-campus of Rutgers University's New Brunswick/Piscataway area campus
  - Livingston College, New Jersey, United States, a former residential college of Rutgers on the Livingston Campus
- Livingston University, former name (1967–1995) of the University of West Alabama
- Livingston High School (disambiguation)

== Places ==
=== Antarctica ===
- Livingston Island in the South Shetland Islands
- Camp Livingston (Antarctica), an Argentine seasonal base camp

=== Australia ===
- County of Livingstone, Queensland

=== Canada ===
- Rural Municipality of Livingston No. 331, Saskatchewan

=== Guatemala ===
- Livingston, Guatemala, a town

=== United Kingdom ===
- Livingston, West Lothian, a town
  - Livingston (Scottish Parliament constituency)
  - Livingston (UK Parliament constituency)
- Livingston Village, West Lothian

=== United States ===
- Livingston, Alabama, a city
- Livingston, California, a city
- Livingston, Georgia, a ghost town
- Livingston, Illinois, Madison County, a village
- Livingston, Kentucky, a home rule-class city
- Livingston, Louisiana, a town and the seat of Livingston Parish
- Livingston, Montana, a town
- Livingston, Mississippi an unincorporated community
- Livingston, New Jersey, a township
- Livingston, New York, a town; also a hamlet in the town
- Livingston, Ohio, a ghost town
- Livingston, South Carolina, a town
- Livingston, Staten Island, a name sometimes applied to the northeastern portion of the neighborhood of West Brighton
- Livingston, Tennessee, a town
- Livingston, Texas, a town
- Livingston, West Virginia, an unincorporated community
- Livingston, Wisconsin, a village
- Lake Livingston, Texas

=== Zambia ===
- Livingstone, Zambia

== Military ==
- Camp Livingston, Louisiana, a US Army camp during World War II
- Fort Livingston, Louisiana, a 19th-century coastal defense fort
- USS Livingston, a World War II United States Navy cargo ship

== Sports ==
- Livingston Open, a former tennis tournament (1984–1989)
- Livingston (basketball), a Scottish basketball club
- Livingston F.C., a Scottish football club
- Livingston RFC, a Scottish rugby union club

== People ==
- Livingston (surname)
- Livingston (given name)
- Livingston (actor), Philip Livingston Jones (born 1957), Indian actor, comedian and screenwriter
- Livingston (musician), Drake Jon Livingston Jr. (born 2002), American singer-songwriter

== Other uses ==
- Lord Livingston, a former title in the Peerage of Scotland
- Livingston (band), British rock band
- Livingston (film), 2016
- Livingston station (disambiguation)
- Livingston Award, a University of Michigan journalism award

== See also ==
- Livingston County (disambiguation)
- Livingston House (disambiguation)
- Livingston Parish, Louisiana
- Livingstone (disambiguation)
