= Livingston House =

Livingston House may refer to:

- Dr. David S. Livingston House, Kingman, Arizona
- Burbank–Livingston–Griggs House, Saint Paul, Minnesota
- Bowers–Livingston–Osborn House, Parsippany, New Jersey
- William Livingston House, Union, New Jersey
- Hyatt-Livingston House, Dobbs Ferry, New York
- Henry W. Livingston House, Livingston, New York
