= Livingston Township =

Livingston Township may refer to the following places in the United States:

- Livingston Township, Otsego County, Michigan
- Livingston, New Jersey

== See also ==
- Livingston (disambiguation)
