= Levingston =

Levingston is a family name originating in Scotland as a habitational name derived from Livingston in Lothian which was originally named in Middle English Levingston. This place name was originally named after a man named Levin who appears in several 12th-century charters. In Ireland (and in some cases in the Highlands of Scotland), the name was adopted by those there exiled royals of Ulaidh (province) or L. Ultonia bearing the Gaelic surnames Ó Duinnshléibhe and Mac Duinnshléibhe (anglicized Dunleavy) and, also, in Ireland and Scotland, later, known as the Mac an Ultaigh (var. Ulaidh) (anglicized MacNulty). Levingston may refer to:

- Andre Levingston, American entrepreneur and basketball coach
- Bashir Levingston (born 1976), American football player
- Bruce Levingston, American concert pianist and recording artist
- Cliff Levingston (born 1961), basketball player
- Frank Levingston (1905–2016), United States military veteran
- Ivan Levingston (born 1994), American journalist and a reporter
- James Levingston, 1st Earl of Newburgh (1622–1670), Scottish peer
- Raydon Levingston (born 1946), Australian cricketer
- Roberto M. Levingston (1920–2015), Argentine Army officer and de facto president of Argentina
- William Levingston, pseudonym of William Avery Rockefeller

== See also ==
- MacDunleavy (dynasty)
- Livingston (disambiguation)
- Livingstone (disambiguation)
- Clan MacLea, many members of which carry the name
- Livingston, West Lothian, also known as Levingston, the assumed origin of the surname
