= William Livingstone =

William Livingstone may refer to:

- William Livingstone House, located in the Brush Park district of Detroit, Michigan, United States
- William Livingstone, 6th Lord Livingston (died 1592), Scottish lord of Parliament
- William Jervis Livingstone (1865–1915), Scottish planter in Africa
- William Livingstone (minister), 17th-century minister and writer in Lanark, Scotland

== See also ==
- William Livingston (disambiguation)
- Bill Livingstone (disambiguation)
