= John Livingston =

John Livingston, or John Livingstone, may refer to:

- John Livingstone (minister) (1603-1672), Scottish Presbyterian minister exiled to Holland
- John Henry Livingston (1746–1825), American academic
- John Henry Livingston (lawyer) (1848–1927), American lawyer
- John Livingston (Australian politician) (1857–1935), Australian politician
- John H. Livingston (1897–1974), American aviator and air race pilot
  - Jonathan Livingston Seagull, 1970 novel by Richard Bach, for which Livingston is considered to be the inspiration and namesake
  - Jonathan Livingston Seagull (film), 1973 film adapted from the novel
  - Jonathan Livingston Seagull (soundtrack), soundtrack album to the 1973 film, recorded by singer-songwriter Neil Diamond
- John Livingston (naturalist) (1923–2006), Canadian naturalist, broadcaster, author, and teacher
- John Livingstone (priest) (1928–2016), British priest
- John Cleve Livingston (born 1947), American rower
- John Livingstone (born c. 1954), Canadian politician
- John Livingston (actor) (born 1970), American actor

== See also ==
- Livingston (surname)
- Livingstone (name)
