= Bill Livingstone =

Bill Livingstone may refer to:

- Bill Livingstone (footballer) (1929-2011), Scottish footballer
- Bill Livingstone (musician) (born 1942), Canadian musician, band leader, composer, and author

== See also ==
- William Livingstone (disambiguation)
