= Charles Livingston =

Charles Livingston may refer to:

- Charles Livingston (American football) (fl. 1880s–1900s), American college football player and coach
- Charles L. Livingston (1800–1873), American politician from New York
- Charles Livingston (mathematician) (fl. 1980s–2020s), American mathematician
