= Ember (coach operator) =

Scottish electric coach company

Ember Core Ltd

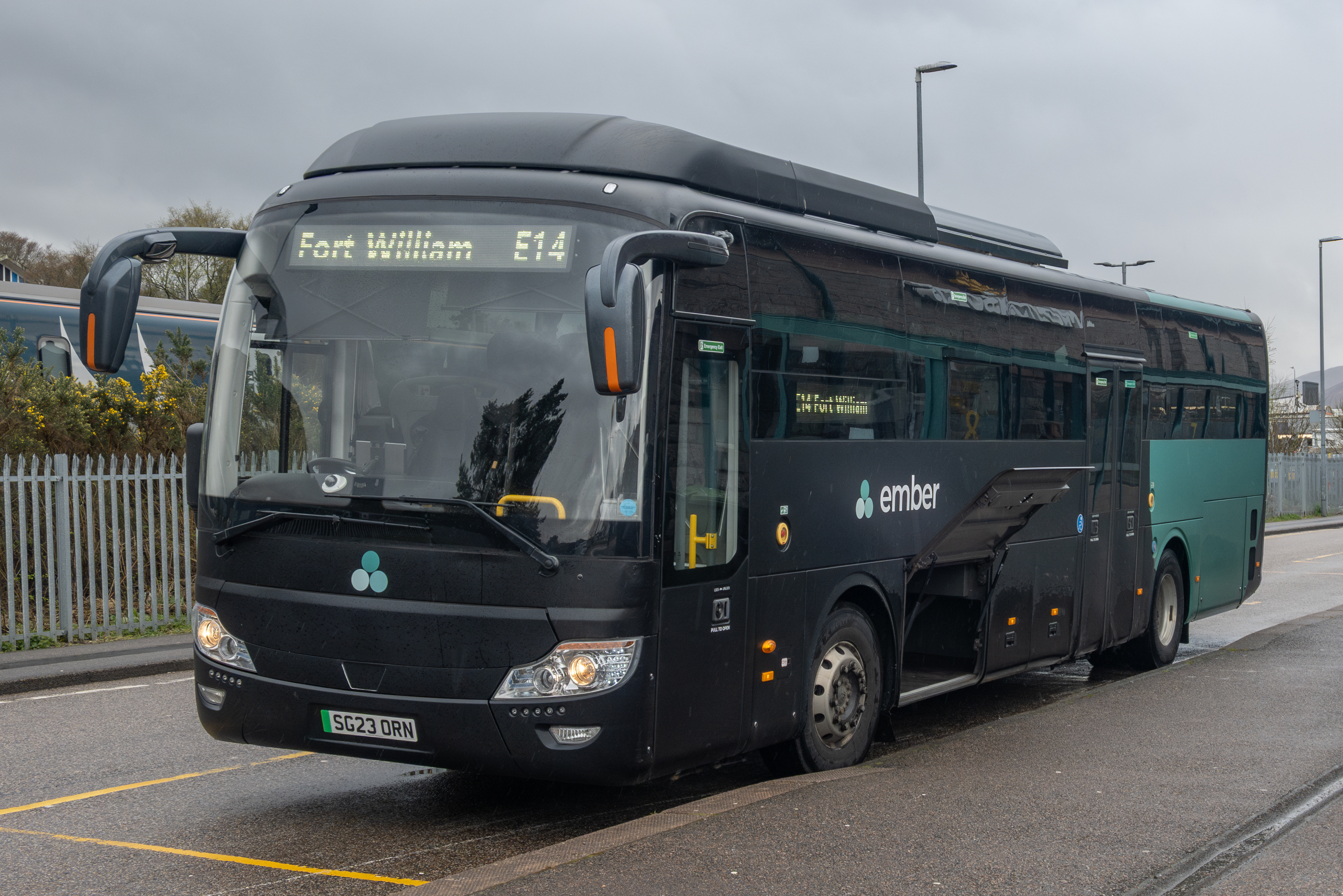
- Yutong TCe12 at Fort William bus station in April 2026
- Founded: 11 June 2019; 7 years ago
- Headquarters: Edinburgh, Scotland, UK
- Locale: Scotland
- Service area: Scotland
- Routes: 19
- Destinations: Dundee; Perth; Edinburgh; Glasgow; Aberdeen; Inverness; Fort William; Thurso; Livingston; Oban; Ullapool; Elgin
- Hubs: Fort William; Thurso
- Depots: Dundee; Aberdeen; Inverness; Livingston
- Fleet: 118
- Fuel type: Electric
- Website: ember.to

Ember Core Ltd, trading as Ember, is a coach operator based in Edinburgh, Scotland. It operates the first electric intercity coach services in Scotland.

== History ==
=== Founding and early development (2019–2020) ===
Ember was founded in 2019 by Pierce Glennie and Keith Bradbury, both of whom had previously worked for iwoca. Glennie has stated that the concept for the company was inspired by a long-distance bus journey he undertook from Namibia to South Africa. The name Ember was chosen to reflect the idea of "the end of fire".

Ember's first planned route, numbered the E1 (Note: The service used to have a counterpart the E2. The E1 ran from Dundee to Edinburgh (and still does), and the E2 ran from Edinburgh to Dundee. Ember renumbered the E2 to E1 while keeping the same route, so now the service has the same route number in both directions.), was to operate between Dundee and Edinburgh. Originally scheduled to commence in March 2020, the launch was delayed due to government restrictions introduced in response to the COVID-19 pandemic, which also postponed the delivery of the company's first electric coach.

To support the launch, Ember received a £490,000 Coronavirus Business Interruption Loan through Triodos Bank. The company ultimately began operations in October 2020 with two battery-electric coaches, which recharged using Dundee City Council charging infrastructure at Greenmarket.

=== Expansion of routes and fleet (2021–2023) ===
In February 2022, Ember was awarded £5,562,126 from the Scottish Zero Emission Bus Fund (ScotZEB) to support the purchase of twenty-six battery-electric vehicles and the associated charging infrastructure. The company stated its intention to develop a national zero-emission coach network connecting Scotland's major cities.

In August 2022, Ember launched a new route between Dundee and Glasgow, designated the E3.

In July 2023, Ember placed an order for fourteen tri-axle Yutong GTe14 battery-electric coaches. This order increased Ember's total fleet of Yutong electric coaches to thirty-eight vehicles. Co-founder Pierce Glennie highlighted the reliability of the company’s existing Yutong TCe12 coaches as a key factor in enabling the rapid expansion of its zero-emission route network within three years of launch. As of July 2024, three of the GTe14 coaches had entered service, with the remainder undergoing fit-out and branding.

=== Network diversification and service enhancements (2024) ===
In January 2024, Ember introduced the E10 service, described by the company as a "short but useful" route, operating between Dundee Michelin Scotland Innovation Parc and Dundee city centre. The service operates more than forty times per day in each direction, calling at three pre-booked stops. The route was designed to make productive use of depot movements that would otherwise constitute dead mileage, while also providing connections with Ember's Edinburgh and Glasgow services, with future through-ticketing planned.

In May 2024, Ember launched the E3X express service between Perth city centre and Glasgow, operating four services per day in each direction, with two services extending to Dundee. The service commenced on 7 May. During the same month, Ember introduced the E1X service operating between Dundee, Kinross, Edinburgh and Wallyford Park and Ride, where vehicles utilised newly installed charging facilities, before returning to Dundee. The E1X service was withdrawn on 22 October 2024.

In September 2024, Ember announced plans to launch a new route linking Bridge of Don and Aberdeen city centre with Edinburgh via Dundee, with intermediate stops including Brechin and Forfar. The route also provides a connection to Edinburgh Airport. Full service commencement was scheduled for 22 October 2024, with twenty services per day operating throughout the week. The introduction of this route doubled the frequency between Dundee and Edinburgh to forty services per day, providing a half-hourly service for much of the day. To support operations, Ember established a new depot in Bridge of Don, complementing its existing depot in Dundee.

=== Further network growth (From 2025) ===
In April 2025, Ember announced the introduction of a new route between Fort William and Edinburgh. A further announcement in May 2025 confirmed the launch of a Fort William to Glasgow service.

In June 2025, the E7 route between Aberdeen and Inverness commenced operations.

In July 2025, Ember announced that the E6 route, operating between Inverness and Thurso & Scrabster, would begin on 9 July. Later that month, on 23 July, the company launched the E11 route between Dundee and Aberdeen via Braemar.

In September 2025, Ember introduced the E4X express service between Edinburgh and Fort William.

On 22 October 2025, Ember commenced operation of the E8 route between Glasgow and Inverness. This was followed by the launch of the E9 route between Edinburgh and Inverness on 5 November 2025.

On 8 September 2026, Ember announced an expansion of the E6 service, with services increasing from four daily to seven daily, and adding Halkirk and Castletown to their Caithness stops, from Wednesday, 14 October 2026.

On 5 October 2026, rival Stagecoach announced an end to its own X99 service from Caithness to Inverness, with their Thurso depot and staff transferring to Highland Council's D&E Coaches.

On 30 September 2026, Ember announced a new Inverness to Portree service, operating daily from Wednesday, 7 October 2026.

=== Coach hire and fleet expansion ===
In September 2025, Ember expanded beyond scheduled intercity services with the launch of Ember Coach Hire, a zero-emission private hire service utilising its electric coach fleet. By late 2025, Ember operated a fully electric fleet of seventy-eight vehicles. A further tranche of coaches funded through the second round of the Scottish Zero Emission Bus Fund (ScotZEB2) is expected to increase the fleet to approximately 138 vehicles in Scotland by the end of the first quarter of 2026.

In March 2026, Ember were awarded £13 million of funding from the Scottish Government as part of the third and final round of the Scottish Zero Emission Bus Fund (ScotZEB3) to support the purchase of 100 new Yutong coaches.

=== Charging infrastructure ===
Ember's charging infrastructure has expanded alongside its fleet growth. In addition to its original hub in Dundee, the company operates charging facilities in Fort William, Thurso and Inverness, with further sites under development in Oban, Perth, Livingston and Glasgow. The network supports both scheduled services and private hire operations.

== Routes ==
- E1 Bridge of Don – Edinburgh, via Aberdeen and Dundee (Note: Half of the services will terminate in Dundee, the others will continue to Bridge of Don.)
- E3 Dundee – Glasgow, via Perth and Stirling
- E4 Fort William - Edinburgh, via Stirling
- E4X Fort William - Edinburgh (express)
- E5 Fort William — Glasgow
- E6 Inverness — Scrabster
- E7 Bridge of Don — Inverness, via Aberdeen
- E8 Glasgow - Inverness, via Perth (Note: 3 services each way per day are non-stop Glasgow - Inverness.)
- E9 Edinburgh - Inverness, via Perth
- E10 Dundee City Centre – Dundee Michelin Scotland Innovation Parc (Note: These services continue to Edinburgh and Glasgow as services E1 and E3, through services can be booked.)
- E11 Dundee – Bridge of Don, via Aberdeen
- E12 Glasgow - Carmyle
- E14 Inverness - Oban, via Fort William
- E15 Edinburgh - Oban, via Stirling
- E16 Glasgow - Oban
- E17 Perth - Aberdeen, via Dundee
- E18 Inverness - Ullapool Ferry Terminal
- E19 Livingston - Edinburgh Airport
- E20 Glasgow- Edinburgh Airport

== Fleet ==
Ember's first two Yutong TCe12 battery electric coaches were delivered in 2020. A further two were added in 2021, and four more in 2022, funded by the Scottish Utra-Low Emission Bus Scheme. Ember has taken delivery of fourteen Yutong GTe14 tri-axle electric coaches in early 2024 – the first operator to order the coach model. Ember was also awarded government funding in March 2021 for four single-deck Arrival buses, the development of which was ultimately postponed in 2022. The company also had eight new additions to the fleet of Yutong TCe12s in 2023.
