= Edward Livingston (disambiguation) =

Edward Livingston (1764-1836) was an American who served as the U.S. Secretary of State, U.S. Minister to France, U.S. Senator, U.S. Representative, Mayor of New York City.

Edward Livingston may also refer to:

- Edward Livingston (speaker) (1796–1840), American who served as the Speaker of the New York State Assembly
- Edward Philip Livingston (1779–1843), American who served as the Lieutenant Governor of New York
- Edward Livingston (clubman) (1834–1906), American businessman who was prominent in New York society
- Edward De Peyster Livingston (1861–1932), American lawyer and society leader during the Gilded Age

== See also ==
- Eddie Livingstone (Edward James Livingstone, 1884–1945), Canadian sports team owner
- J. Ed Livingston (J. Edwin Livingston, 1892–1971), Chief Justice of the Supreme Court of Alabama
- Burton Edward Livingston (1875–1948), American botanist
- Edward Livingston Trudeau (1848–1915), American physician who established the Adirondack Cottage Sanitarium
- Edward Livingston Wilson (1838–1903), American photographer
- Edward Livingston Martin (1837–1897), American lawyer and politician from Delaware
- Edward Livingston Youmans (1821–1887), American scientific writer, editor and founder of Popular Science magazine
