= Henry Livingston =

Henry Livingston may refer to:

- Henry Brockholst Livingston (1757–1823), United States Supreme Court justice
- Henry W. Livingston (1768–1810), U.S. congressman
- Henry Livingston Jr. (Henry Beekman Livingston, 1748–1828), American author and American Revolutionary War colonel
- Henry A. Livingston (1776–1849), American politician from New York
- Henry Beekman Livingston (born 1854) (1854–1931), American banker and socialite
- Henry Gilbert Livingston (1714–1799), American doctor and politician from New York

== See also ==
- Henry Livingstone (1890–1959), New Zealand politician
- Henry W. Livingston House
- Harry Livingston French, American architect
