= Arrival Bus =

Low-floor single-decker electric bus

Overview
- Type: Bus
- Manufacturer: Arrival
- Assembly: Banbury, Oxfordshire; Rock Hill, South Carolina

Body and chassis
- Class: Single-decker bus
- Layout: Rear-motor, rear-wheel drive
- Doors: 1, 2 or 3
- Floor type: Low-floor
- Chassis: Integral

Powertrain
- Capacity: 310.8 kWh
- Range: 200–408 km (124–254 mi) (payload-dependent up to 8,000 kg (18,000 lb)
- Plug-in charging: AC and DC charging capability

Dimensions
- Length: 10.5 to 12 m (34 to 39 ft)
- Height: 3.0 m (9.8 ft)
- Kerb weight: 8,000 kg (8.0 t), unladen 16,000 kg (16 t), GVW

The Arrival Bus was a proposed low-floor single-decker electric bus model manufactured by British electric vehicle producer Arrival. Prototypes of the bus commenced construction and entered beta testing in 2020, with the first prototype unveiling occurring in November 2021. Ongoing testing of prototypes was expected, with full-scale production stated to begin by the end of 2022.

Arrival secured a letter of intent with Ember to serve as the primary launch customer for the Arrival Bus, while FirstGroup were expected to conduct additional testing across the United Kingdom.

Two primary models were planned: the Arrival Bus B10, spanning 10.5 meters (34 ft), and the Arrival Bus B12, measuring 12 meters (39 ft) and accommodating up to 36 passenger seats. Distribution would extend to both European and North American markets, with manufacturing operations planned at Arrival's primary facility in Bicester, Oxfordshire, for the European market, and at a microfactory in Rock Hill, South Carolina, for the North American market.

In May 2022, the Arrival Bus obtained safety certification from the European Union, clearing the path for production to commence. However, in August 2022, Arrival announced a pause in the development of its bus and car projects, leading to the postponement of trials with FirstGroup.

The Arrival Bus factory in Bicester was purchased by Wrightbus in 2024, who used the site to launch a new battery-electric bus repowering subsidiary company named NewPower in June 2024.
