= Livingstone (name) =

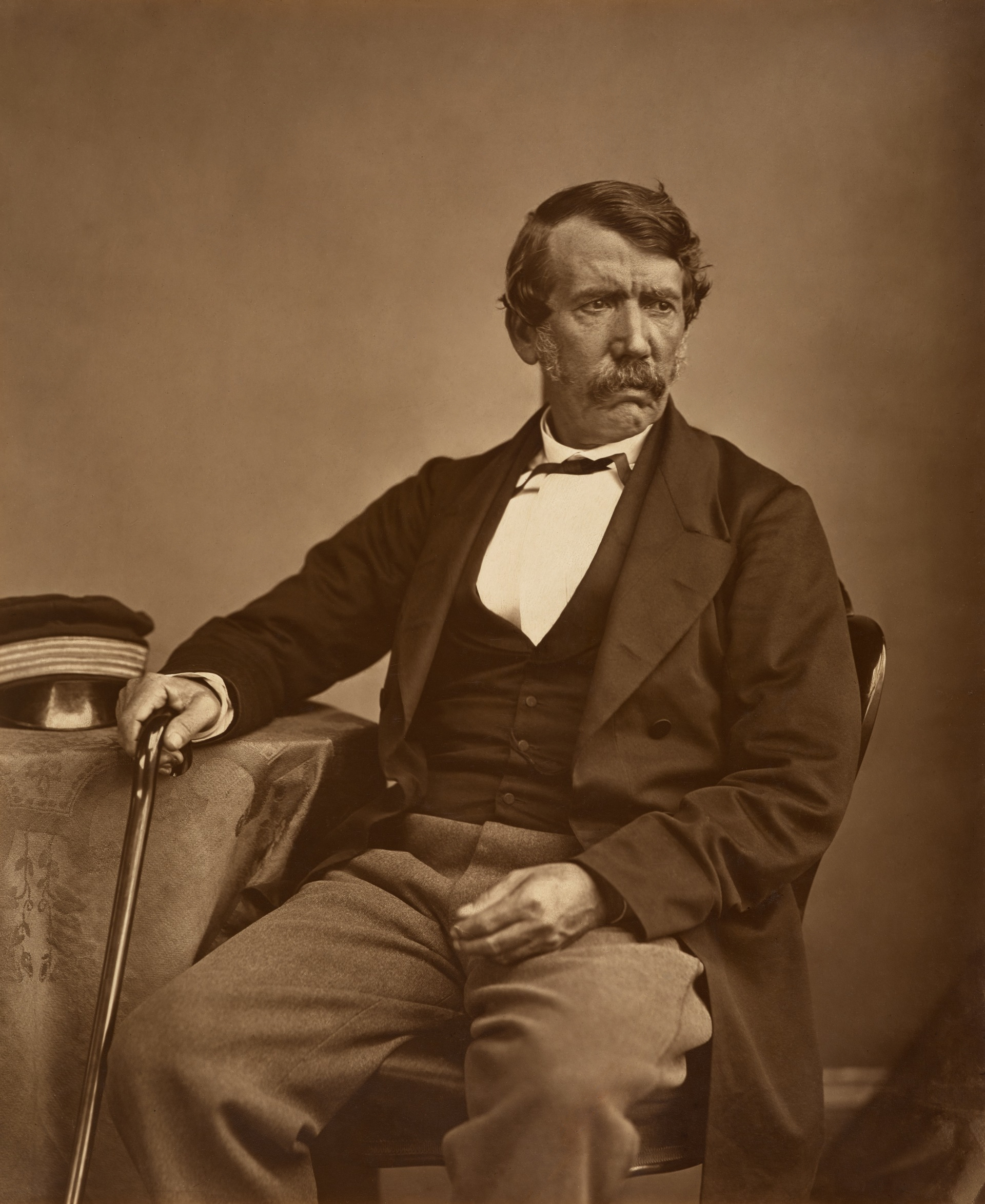
- Scottish physician and explorer David Livingstone

Origin
- Origin: Scotland

Livingstone is a surname and given name. The surname is toponymic. It is one of the habitual surnames eventually adopted by members of the Scottish branch of the Irish Dunleavy (Gaelic language Duinnshléibhe)/MacNulty royals, including the ancestors of the African missionary doctor and African explorer David Livingstone. There may be a relationship between the Livingstones and Clan MacLea.

== Notable people ==
=== Surname ===
- Adelaide Livingstone (died 1970), peace activist
- Alexander Livingstone (Scottish politician)
- Archie Livingstone (footballer, born 1915) (1915–1961), Scottish footballer
- Bob Livingstone (1922–2013), American football player
- Bobby Livingstone, Scottish footballer
- Bruce Livingstone (born 1971), Canadian entrepreneur
- Colin H. Livingstone, American scout
- David Livingstone 1813–1873, Scottish missionary explorer of Africa, best-known bearer of the name and namesake of numerous places
- David N. Livingstone (born 1953), geographer
- Doug Livingstone (1898–1981), Scottish football player
- Douglas Livingstone (1932–1996), South African poet
- Duncan Livingstone (d. 1964) South African poet
- Eddie Livingstone (1884–1945), Canadian sports teram owner and manager
- Frank Livingstone (bowls), New Zealand lawn bowler
- Ian Livingstone (born 1949), English fantasy author
- Ian Livingstone (disambiguation), various people
- Jake Livingstone (ice hockey) (born 1999), Canadian ice hockey player
- Janet Livingstone (1643–1696), Scottish activist against religious persecution
- Ken Livingstone (born 1945), English politician
- Liam Livingstone, English cricketer
- Margaret Livingstone (born 1950), American neuroscientist
- Marilyn Livingstone (born 1952), Scottish politician
- Mary Livingstone (Sadye Marks) (1905–1983), American radio comedian, widow and radio partner of Jack Benny
- Nicole Livingstone (née Stevenson), Australian swimmer
- Parker Livingstone (born 2006), American football player
- Paul Livingstone American musician and composer
- Peadar Livingstone, Irish priest, linguist, and historian
- Richard Winn Livingstone, gave the Rede Lecture in 1944 on Plato and modern education
- Robert Livingstone (born 1967), Canadian businessman
- Scott Livingstone (born 1965), baseball player
- Sergio Livingstone (1920-2011), Chilean footballer
- Sidney Livingstone (born 1945), English actor
- Stacey Livingstone (born 1988), Australian footballer
- Susan Livingstone, American administrator and civil servant
- Terasa Livingstone (born 1975), Australian actress
- Joseph Livingstone (1942-2009), English footballer

=== Given name ===
- Livingstone Adjin (born 1989), Ghanaian footballer
- Livingstone Harris (born 1957), West Indian cricketer
- Livingstone Lawrence (born 1962), West Indian cricketer
- Livingstone Lusinde (born 1972), Tanzanian politician
- Livingstone Sargeant (born 1947), West Indian cricketer
- Livingstone Walker (1879–1940), English cricketer

== See also ==
- Donlevy
- Clan MacLea
- Gaels
- Highlands of Scotland
- Lowland Scots language
- Livingston, West Lothian, presumed origin of the name
- Living stone
- Levingston
- Livingston (surname)
- MacDunleavy (dynasty)
