= Bowers–Livingston–Osborn House =

Historic house in New Jersey, United States

- U.S. National Register of Historic Places
- New Jersey Register of Historic Places
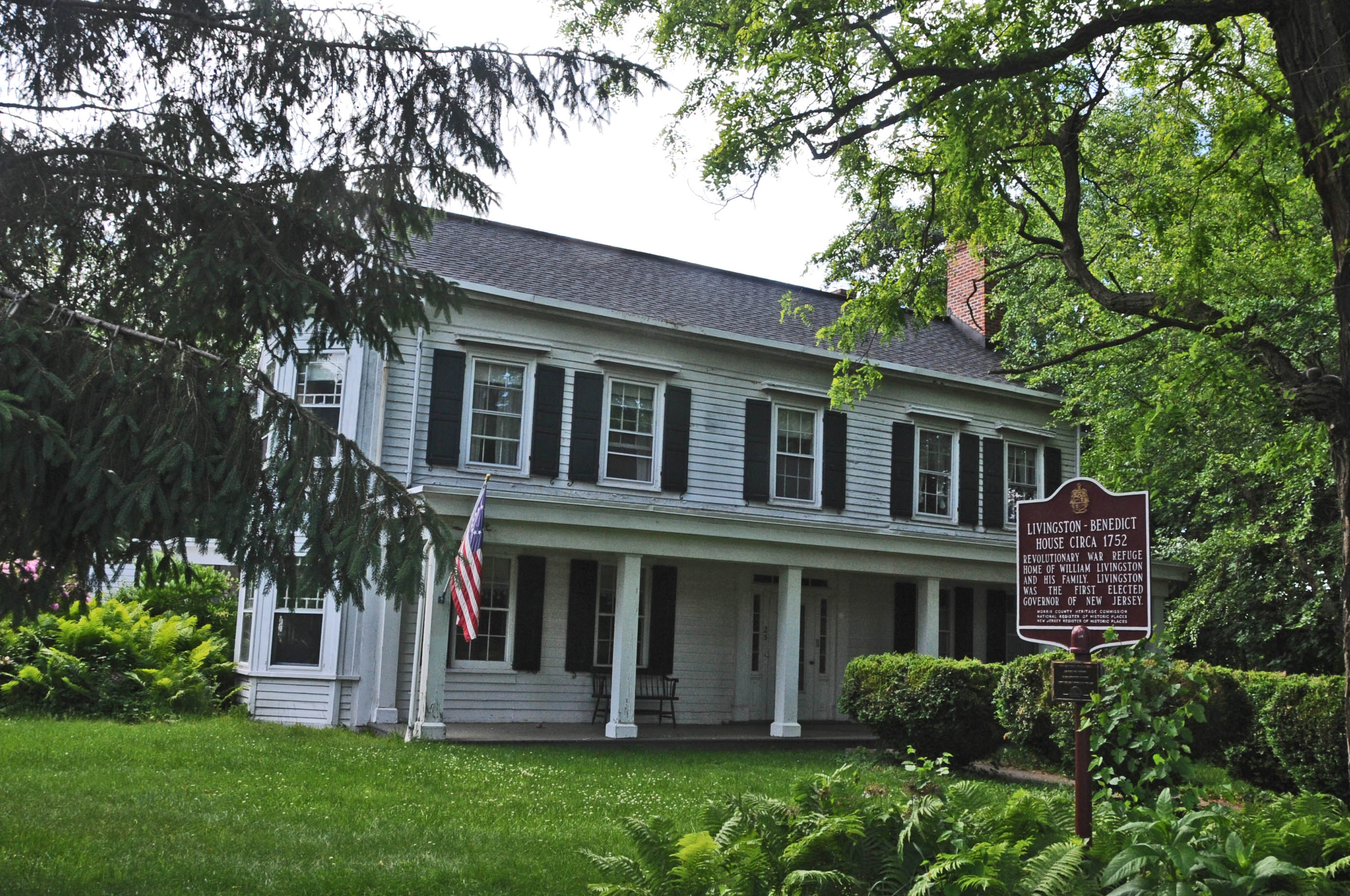

- Location within Morris County, New Jersey Location within New Jersey Location within the United States
- Location: 25 Parsippany Road, Parsippany-Troy Hills, New Jersey
- Coordinates: 40.8647°N 74.4259°W
- Area: 9 acres (3.6 ha)
- Built: c. 1752
- NRHP reference No.: 73001128
- NJRHP No.: 2212

Significant dates
- Added to NRHP: June 19, 1973
- Designated NJRHP: January 29, 1973

The Bowers–Livingston–Osborn House, also known as the William Livingston House, is located at 25 Parsippany Road in the township of Parsippany–Troy Hills in Morris County, New Jersey, United States. The historic house was built around 1752 and was documented by the Historic American Buildings Survey (HABS) in 1939. It was added to the National Register of Historic Places on June 19, 1973, for its significance in architecture and politics/government.

The house was originally owned by Lemuel Bowers, who probably operated it as a tavern. William Livingston, the first governor of New Jersey, leased the house from 1777 to 1780. He returned to his home, Liberty Hall, in 1780. Thomas Osborn bought the property in 1785.

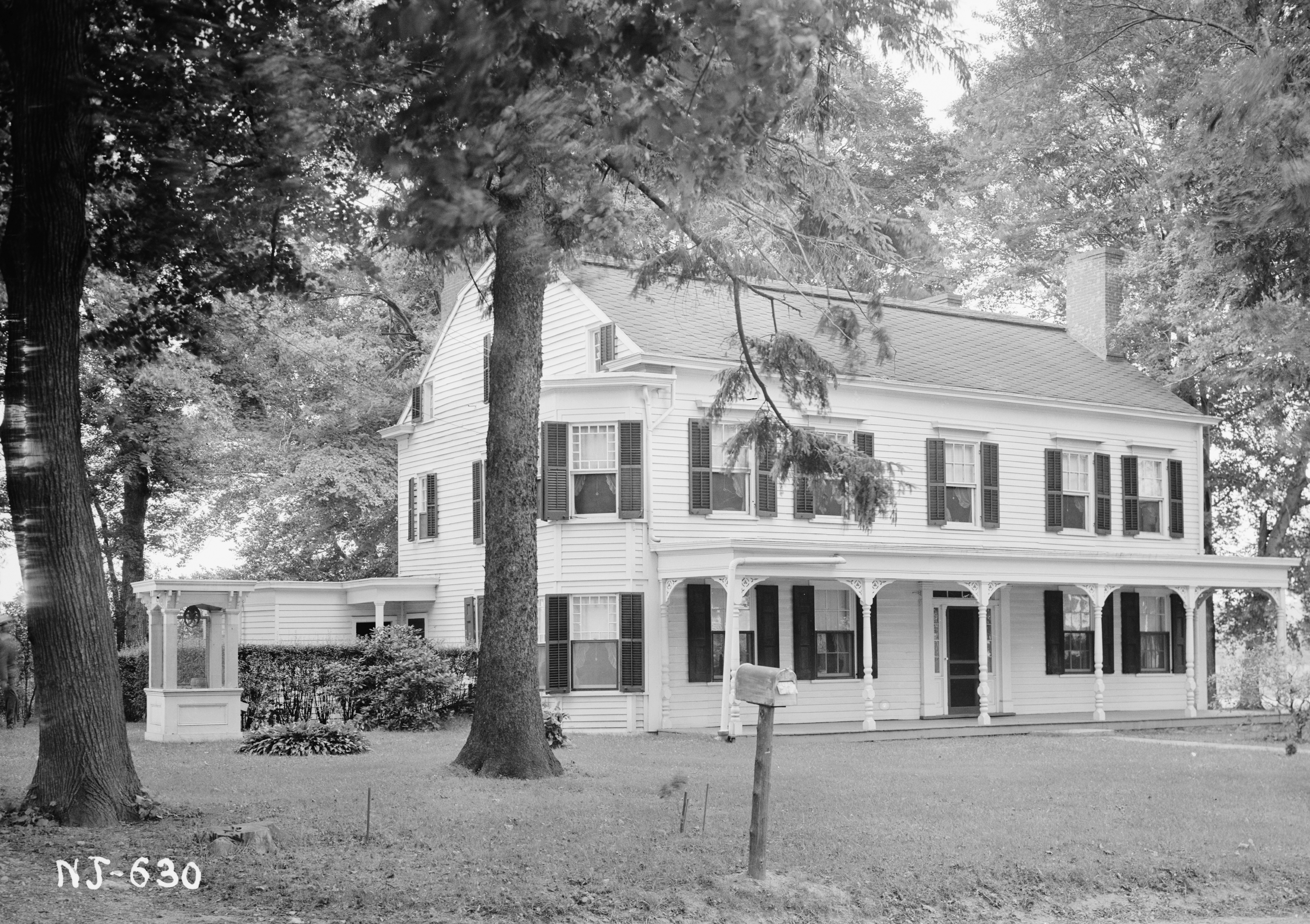
HABS photo from 1939

== See also ==
- National Register of Historic Places listings in Morris County, New Jersey
- List of the oldest buildings in New Jersey
