= Scottish Zero Emission Bus Challenge Fund =

Government scheme to decarbonise buses

The Scottish Zero Emission Bus challenge fund, commonly referred to as "ScotZEB" was a Scottish Government program which provided grant funds, vehicles, and charging stations to bus and coach operators with the aim of accelerating the adoption of zero-emission vehicles and their charging infrastructure. ScotZEB was a successor to the "Scottish Ultra-Low Emission Bus Scheme" (SULEBS) which was itself a successor to the "Scottish Green Bus Fund". Counting all 3 phases, ScotZEB paid out £168 million in subsidy, making it the largest investment ever to help decarbonise Scotland's bus fleet.

== Phase 1 (2021–2022) ==
In the first round, the government awarded £62 million to 11 bus companies. The funding was split as shown:

| Bus operator | Amount claimed | Buses purchased |
|---|---|---|
| Bluebird Buses Ltd. | £3,066,547 | 13 |
| Craig of Cambeltown Ltd. | £2,409,294 | 10 |
| Dumfries and Galloway Council | £523,739 | 4 |
| Ember Core Ltd. | £5,562,126 | 26 |
| Fife Scottish Omnibuses | £6,809,264 | 32 |
| First Aberdeen Ltd. & First Glasgow No1 Ltd. | £18,597,293 | 74 |
| Highland Country Buses Ltd. | £5,708,424 | 25 |
| Houston Coaches | £360,246 | 4 |
| McGill's Bus Services Ltd. | £8,664,557 | 41 |
| Shuttle Buses Ltd. | £523,740 | 4 |
| Western Buses Ltd. | £8,029,890 | 39 |

Stirling Council was offered £595,404 but ultimately did not claim any money.

== Phase 2 (2023–2024) ==
This round marked a significant change in strategy. Unlike the previous and successive phases, Phase 2 was a single payment from the Scottish Government, who gave £41.7 million to Zenobē Energy consortium, which then acted as the distributor of funds, ultimately delivering 248 zero-emission buses and coaches split between eight different public transport operators and public bodies. ScotZEB2 is the first scheme in the UK to support zero-emisison coaches for non scheduled bus services, with tourism related work, private hire, and other fields explicitly eligible under Transport Scotland's guidance. Zenobē Energy has not published the amount awarded to each company, only the vehicles they received, which can be seen here:

| Company or body | Vehicles received |
|---|---|
| D&E Coaches | 5 |
| Ember Core Ltd. | 100 |
| Hairy Haggis Tours | 2 |
| Maynes Coaches | 12 |
| McGill's Bus Services Ltd. | 42 |
| NHS Greater Glasgow and Clyde | 5 |
| Premier Coaches | 4 |
| Stagecoach Group | 78 |

== Phase 3 (2025–2026) ==
ScotZEB3, was the final phase of the Scottish Zero Emission Bus challenge fund. £45 million was provided to 5 companies in a model more similar to ScotZEB1. 4 of the 5 companies that received funding were large, traditional operators, with the only exception being Rock Road, a subsidiary of Rock Rail. Rock Road operates under a similar business model as their parent company, leasing out vehicles to operators rather than operating any bus routes themselves. The funding was split as shown:

| Company or bus operator | Subsidy awarded | Number of vehicles | Number of chargers |
|---|---|---|---|
| Ember Core Ltd. | £13,174,147 | 100 | 43 |
| Stagecoach Group | £4,568,280.40 | 43 | 25 |
| Rock Road | £11,500,317.08 | 93 | 101 |
| Lothian Buses | £9,567,260 | 60 | 88 |
| FirstGroup | £5,989,966 | 37 | 38 |

=== Criticisms ===
The owners of McGill's Buses, brothers Sandy and James Easdale claimed that their company was unfairly excluded from ScotZEB3 funding, and that their £4.3 million bid would have triggered a £16 million procurement order for 33 electric buses from Alexander Dennis. Most of the money ended up being spent on Chinese-built Yutong coaches and buses, which would not replace aging diesel vehicles, but put new vehicles on the road. The dispute drew parallel criticism from political opposition parties and trade unions, who argued that utilizing public subsidies to import foreign-assembled vehicles undermined the domestic supply chain at a time when Scottish bus manufacturing jobs were facing employment vulnerabilities. Five days after the ScotZEB3 awards were made public, Alexander Dennis announced a major restructuring of its central Scotland footprint. While a government-backed furlough scheme helped safeguard roughly 350 remaining Scottish roles, the manufacturer confirmed it would close its legacy Falkirk factory and consolidate its remaining operations into a chassis-manufacturing hub at its nearby Larbert site, resulting in up to 115 redundancies.

In May 2026, an Environmental Information Regulation freedom of information form was released by the Scottish Government. It revealed an immensely competitive environment for the applicants. Only 9 applications were submitted, and of those 9, 4 were refused any grant at all, 1 did not receive their requested amount, and 4 received their full requested amount. When journalists and operators asked to see the actual scoring sheets, panel moderation minutes, and internal decision notes, Transport Scotland withheld the information, citing legal exceptions regarding internal government communications.

Following the refusal to disclose the internal grading materials, McGill's Bus Service Limited elevated the dispute on 11 July 2026 by filing a formal legal claim against the Scottish Ministers and Transport Scotland at the Competition Appeal Tribunal (CAT). McGill's lawsuit alleges that the award process violated statutory subsidy principles, asserting that public funds were inappropriately used to subsidise speculative new commercial routes rather than decarbonising existing infrastructure. The legal filing sought a formal overturn of the March 2026 awards and a comprehensive judicial review of Transport Scotland's evaluation criteria.
