= Livingston (given name) =

Livingston is a masculine given name which may refer to:

- Livingston Allen (born 1991), Jamaican-American podcaster and YouTuber
- Livingston L. Biddle Jr. (1918–2002), American author and promoter of funding of the arts
- Livingston L. Holder Jr. (born 1956), retired United States Air Force astronaut and aerospace engineer
- Livingston T. Merchant (1903–1976), American diplomat and government official
- Livingston Middlemost (1839–1897), English cricketer
- Livingston Rowe Schuyler (1868–1931), American historian and Episcopal priest
- Livingston Taylor (born 1950), American singer-songwriter and folk musician

== See also ==
- Livingstone (name), a surname and given name
