= William Livingston (disambiguation) =

William Livingston (1723–1790) was Governor of New Jersey.

Wiliam Livingston may also refer to:

- William Livingston (British politician) (fl. 1650–1713), member of parliament for Aberdeen Burghs
- William Livingston (poet) (1808–1870), Gaelic poet, known for the poem Uilleam Mac Dhun Lèibhe
- William S. Livingston (1920–2013), political science professor
- William E. Livingston (1832–1919), Massachusetts politician
- William Livingston, 3rd Viscount of Kilsyth, involved in Acts of Union 1707
- William Livingston, 4th Lord Livingston (fl. 1502–1518), Scottish nobleman
- William Livingston, 4th Lord Livingston of Callendar, see Alexander Livingston, 5th Lord Livingston
- William Livingston (Washington County, NY) in 27th New York State Legislature
- William Livingston (long jumper), 1877 United States long jump champion
- William Livingston (pole vaulter) (born 1907), American pole vaulter, 1930 All-American for the USC Trojans track and field team
- William Livingston Larned (1880–1960), American writer and poet

== See also ==
- William Livingstone (disambiguation)
