= Ian Livingstone (disambiguation) =

Ian Livingstone (born 1949) is an English fantasy author and video games entrepreneur.

Ian Livingstone may also refer to:

- Ian Livingstone (composer), British composer
- Ian Livingstone (economist) (1933–2001), British development economist
- Ian Livingstone (property developer) (born 1962), British property developer
- Ian Lang Livingstone (born 1938), Scottish businessman
- Ian Livingston, Baron Livingston of Parkhead (born 1964), British Minister of State for Trade and Investment (Conservative), former CEO of British Telecom
