= Yutong TCe12 =

Chinese battery electric coach

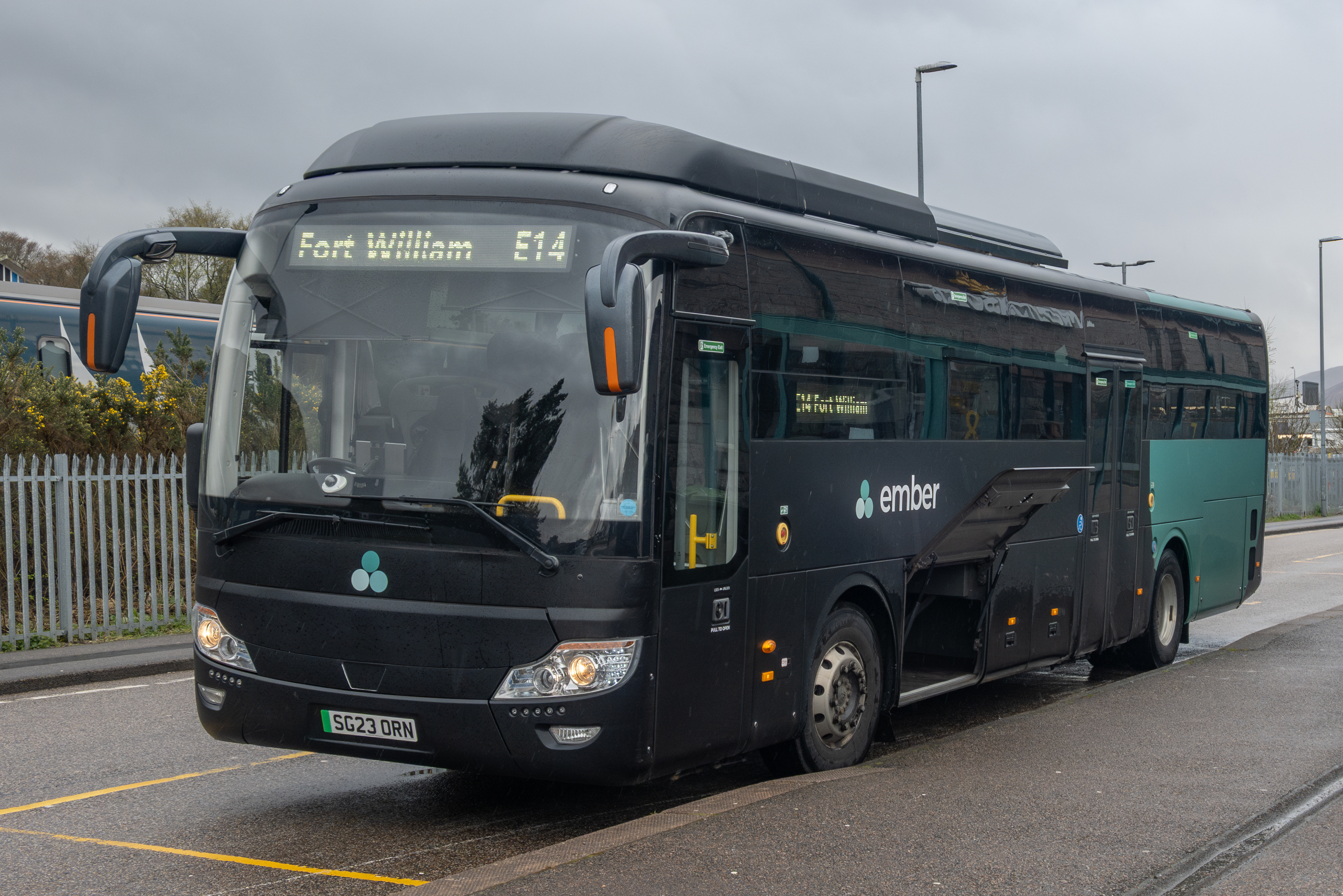
- Ember Core Yutong TCe12 at Fort William bus station in April 2026

Overview
- Manufacturer: Yutong
- Also called: Yutong ICe12
- Production: 2017–Present
- Assembly: Zhengzhou, China

Body and chassis
- Class: Coach
- Doors: 2
- Floor type: High floor
- Related: Yutong E10

Powertrain
- Capacity: Up to 50 seated
- Power output: 258/374 kW electric motor
- Battery: 281 kWh lithium iron phosphate

Dimensions
- Length: 12.4 metres (41 ft)
- Width: 2,550 millimetres (8.37 ft)
- Height: 3,400 millimetres (11.2 ft)
- Curb weight: 13,500 kilograms (13.5 t)

The Yutong TCe12, sold as the Yutong ICe12 in continental Europe, is a battery electric coach manufactured by Yutong in Zhengzhou since 2017 for international bus and coach operators. It is based on the same technology used in the Yutong E10 battery-electric single-deck bus, having a maximum all-electric range of 320 kilometres (200 miles), and can be configured as a school bus.

== Operators ==
Yutong ICe12s have proved particularly popular with French bus and coach operators. The first export order, consisting of 12 ICe12s intended for school services in Paris was received by SAVAC in October 2017, followed by two ICe12s being delivered to the French arm of European inter-city coaching firm Flixbus for services connecting Paris and Amiens in April 2018. In the Provence-Alpes-Côte d'Azur region, ten ICe12s entered service at Transdev depots in the region in August 2019 for use on Zou! coach services connecting Aix-en-Provence, Avignon and Toulon. Elsewhere, four were delivered for Transdev services in Nouvelle-Aquitaine connecting the communes of Bergerac and Périgueux, and examples were delivered to PNA Aérial, Transdev Darche-Gros, RGE Mobilité and Autocars Vincent Bobet.

Elsewhere in continental Europe, Yutong ICe12s have been delivered to Luxembourgish operator Voyages Emile Weber for school transport in Bissen and to Italian operator Martini Bus for a shuttle service between Venice's airport and railway stations, while in Poland, the rural gminas of Śniadowo, Ojrzeń and Ożarów Mazowiecki have each taken delivery of ICe12s for school transport between villages, with a fourth ICe12 on order for Gmina Jawornik Polski.

New Zealand operator Mahu City Express took delivery of two Yutong TCe12s in 2021, which are used on its express commuter services connecting the Auckland CBD with Warkworth and Snells Beach.

=== United Kingdom ===
In the United Kingdom, deliveries for Yutong TCe12s commenced with the delivery of two TCe12s to Westway Coach Services in 2019; the operator would subsequently take delivery of two more in 2019 and 2021. Ember Core, the largest operator of TCe12s in the United Kingdom, purchased their first two TCe12s for use on the UK's first zero-emissions intercity service serving Dundee and Edinburgh in 2020, subsequently purchasing four more for delivery in 2021 and 2022 and planning to operate a total of 38 zero-emissions coaches across Scotland. Four TCe12s were delivered to Welsh municipal Newport Transport's coaching fleet in June 2023, and a TCe12 became the first zero-emissions coach on the Scottish Citylink coach network when it commenced operations on a service between Glasgow and Troon on 29 March 2024, operated by Hairy Haggis Coaches.

Smaller orders for TCe12s in the United Kingdom have been delivered to or ordered by operators such as London sightseeing operator Evan Evans Tours, Turners Coachways of Bristol, Wattsway Travel, Coatham Coaches, Swans Travel Bennetts of Gloucestershire, who took delivery of a single demonstrator model from UK Yutong supplier Pelican Bus & Coach, Roberts Travel of Coalville, York Pullman and Big Green Coach. Six coach operators partnered with smart bus platform Zeelo operated TCe12s on trial during 2023, resulting in purchases of TCe12s by partner operators Landflight Travel Services and Ratho Coaches following the trial's conclusion. TCe12s have also entered service with other Zeelo-partnered operators including AirSym of Heathrow, with one providing school transport to Dwight School London.
