= James Livingston =

James Livingston may refer to:

- James Livingston (bishop) (died 1483), Bishop of Dunkeld
- James Livingston, 1st Earl of Callendar (c. 1590s–1674), army officer who fought on the Royalist side in the Wars of the Three Kingdoms
- James Livingstone, 1st Viscount Kilsyth (1616–1661), Scottish Royalist, raised to the peerage of Scotland as Viscount Kilsyth and Lord Campsie in 1661
- James Livingston (American Revolution) (1747–1832), colonel of the 1st Canadian Regiment
- James Livingston (Canadian politician) (1838–1920), member of Canadian House of Commons
- James E. Livingston (born 1940), United States Marine Corps Medal of Honor recipient
- Jamie Livingston (1956–1997), New York-based photographer, filmmaker and circus performer
- James Livingston (ice hockey) (born 1990), hockey player for the Manchester Monarchs of the AHL
- James Livingston (soldier) (1840–1915), New Zealand soldier and community leader
- James Livingston, 1st Earl of Newburgh (1622–1670), Scottish peer
- James Livingston, 1st Lord Livingston (c. 1410–1467), Scottish nobleman
- James Livingston, 5th Earl of Linlithgow (died 1723), Scottish nobleman
