= Living stone =

Living stone may refer to:

- Lithops, a genus of succulent plants
- The Living Stone, a 1958 documentary film

== See also ==
- Livingstone
