= Livingston station =

Livingston station may refer to:

- Livingston North railway station, a station in Livingston, Scotland on the Edinburgh-Bathgate Line
- Livingston South railway station, a station in Livingston, Scotland on the Shotts Line
- Livingston railway station, a former station in Livingston, Scotland
- Livingston station (Staten Island Railway), a former station on the Staten Island Railway
- Newpark railway station, a former station in Livingston, Scotland
- Livingston Station, West Lothian, a village now part of the new town of Livingston, Scotland
- Livingston Station, Kentucky, the former name of a village in Kentucky
- Livingston station (Northern Pacific Railway), a former station in Livingston, Montana
- Livingston station (Altamont Corridor Express), a future station in Livingston, California
