= Bill Livingstone (musician) =

Canadian musician (1942–2025)

- Born: William "Bill" John Roderick Livingstone; March 20, 1942; Copper Cliff, Ontario, Canada
- Died: February 22, 2025 (aged 82)
- Education: Laurentian University, BA (Psychology), Osgoode Hall Law School, LLB
- Occupation: Musician/Lawyer
- Website: billlivingstone.ca

William John Roderick Livingstone (March 20, 1942 - February 22, 2025) was a Canadian musician, band leader, composer, and author. He was the founding Pipe Major of the 78th Fraser Highlanders Pipe Band and the first non-Scottish Pipe Major to win the world championship. He published an autobiography, two books of compositions, seven albums, and five volumes of A Piobaireachd Diary and received several awards and accolades. He was also a highland bagpipe teacher and adjudicator

== Career ==
As Pipe Major of the 78th Fraser Highlanders, Bill Livingstone won the Canadian and North American Championship a dozen times. He was the first non-Scottish band to win the Grade 1 title at the World Pipe Band Championships in 1987 (Glasgow, Scotland) and one of only four bands outside Scotland to win gold. The band's Live in Ireland, released that same year, is still the best-selling piping and drumming live album of all time. Under Bill's leadership, the 78th Fraser Highlanders Pipe Band recorded eight music recordings, including the "Live in Ireland" projects in Glasgow (2016) and Belfast (2017).

Livingstone has received several professional solo piping awards and pipe band honours. In 2005, he marked his retirement from solo competition by releasing his reflective, five-album set of "A Piobaireachd Diary" recording. Bill was also featured in Volume 9 of The World's Greatest Pipers series (Lismore Records, 1991).

== Awards and recognition ==
Livingstone won several awards and accolades, including solo prizes, which include:

- 1973 - The Open Piobaireachd (North American Championships, Maxville, ON)
- 1974 - The Open Piobaireachd (North American Championships, Maxville, ON)
- 1974- Strathspey & Reel and the Jig (The Northern Meeting, Inverness)
- 1977 - The Gold Medal for Piobaireachd (The Northern Meeting, Inverness)
- 1977 - March (The Argyllshire Gathering, Oban)
- 1978 - Strathspey & Reel (The Argyllshire Gathering, Oban)
- 1978 - The Piobaireachd Society (Canada) Gold Medal for Piobaireachd
- 1979 - The Piobaireachd Society (Canada) Gold Medal for Piobaireachd
- 1979 - The Gold Medal for Piobaireachd (The Argyllshire Gathering, Oban)
- 1981 - The Gold Clasp to The Gold Medal (The Northern Meeting, Inverness)
- 1981 - The Open Piobaireachd (North American Championships, Maxville, ON)
- 1981 - The Piobaireachd Society (Canada) Gold Medal for Piobaireachd
- 1982 - Bar to The Piobaireachd Society (Canada) Gold Medal (former winners)
- 1984 - The Gold Clasp to The Gold Medal (The Northern Meeting, Inverness)
- 1983 - Bar to The Piobaireachd Society (Canada) Gold Medal (former winners)
- 1984 - Bar to The Piobaireachd Society (Canada) Gold Medal (former winners)
- 1985 - Bar to The Piobaireachd Society (Canada) Gold Medal (former winners)
- 1986 - Bar to The Piobaireachd Society (Canada) Gold Medal (former winners)
- 1987 - The Open Piobaireachd (North American Championships, Maxville, ON)
- 1988 - The Open Piobaireachd (North American Championships, Maxville, ON)
- 1989 - The Open Piobaireachd North American Championships, Maxville, ON)
- 1990 - Bar to The Piobaireachd Society (Canada) Gold Medal (former winners)
- 1991 - Bar to The Piobaireachd Society (Canada) Gold Medal (former winners)
- 1992 - The Open Piobaireachd (North American Championships, Maxville, ON)
- 1993 - The Open Piobaireachd (North American Championships, Maxville, ON)
- 1994 - The Open Piobaireachd North American Championships, Maxville, ON)
- 1996 - Bar to The Piobaireachd Society (Canada) Gold Medal (former winners)
- 1997 - The Open Piobaireachd (North American Championships, Maxville, ON)
- 1997 - Bar to The Piobaireachd Society (Canada) Gold Medal (former winners)
- 1998 - The Open Piobaireachd (North American Championships, Maxville, ON)
- 1998 - Bar to The Piobaireachd Society (Canada) Gold Medal (former winners)
- 1999 - Bar to The Piobaireachd Society (Canada) Gold Medal (former winners)
- 2000 - Bar to The Piobaireachd Society (Canada) Gold Medal (former winners)
- 2001 - Bar to The Piobaireachd Society (Canada) Gold Medal (former winners)
- 2002- First prize, piobaireachd at the Glenfiddich Championships.

== Discography ==
Livingstone has recorded seven solo albums:

- Glasgow label Lismore Recordings released "Bill Livingstone, Pipe Major" (1991) in its World's Greatest Pipers Series (Vol.9)
- Bill Livingstone: A Piobaireachd Diary Vol. 1
- Bill Livingstone: A Piobaireachd Diary Vol. 2
- Bill Livingstone: A Piobaireachd Diary Vol. 3
- The Dan Reid Tunes, and Bill Livingstone: A Piobaireachd Diary Vol. 4 - The Dan Reid Tunes.
- Bill Livingstone: A Piobaireachd Diary Vol. 5
- Northern Man (2009)

As P/M of the 78th Fraser Highlanders albums include:

- 78th Fraser Highlanders (Faces album) (1984)
- Up to the Line (1985)
- Live in Concert in Ireland (1987)
- The Immigrant's Suite (1990)
- Live in Canada - The Megantic Outlaw Concert (1992)
- Live in Scotland (1994)
- Flame of Wrath (1998)
- Cascade (2003)

== Books ==
1. Pipe Major, William Livingstone Vol. 1
2. Pipe Major, William Livingstone Vol. 2
3. Preposterous, Tales to Follow (2017)
