= Livingston, West Virginia =

- Unincorporated community
- Location within West Virginia and the United States Livingston (the United States)
- Coordinates: 38°9′27″N 81°24′24″W
- Country: United States
- State: West Virginia
- County: Kanawha
- Elevation: 666 ft (203 m)
- Time zone: UTC-5 (Eastern (EST))
  - Summer (DST): UTC-4 (EDT)
- GNIS ID: 1542274

Livingston is an unincorporated community and coal town in Kanawha County, West Virginia, United States. It was also known as Wacamoh.
