= Ian Livingstone (economist) =

Ian Livingstone (1933–2001) was a noted British development economist.

== Early life ==
Livingstone was born in France to Scottish parents. His family returning to the UK just prior to France falling to the Nazi's 1940. He studied economics at the University of Sheffield graduating with a first class degree. He followed this with post-graduate studies at Yale University.

== Career ==
Livinstone's first proper job was a civil service posting in Salisbury, Rhodesia and this was followed shortly after by his first academic job as one of the first staff in the economics department of Makerere University. After several years there he returned to Sheffield and became a lecturer in economic statistics in his old department. In 1965 he returned to head the economics department at Makerere, and then went on to lead the economic research bureau at the University of Dar es Salaam, Tanzania (1968-71). He also worked in the mid-70s as a research professor in the Institute of Development Studies (University of Nairobi) in Kenya. This was followed by a return to the UK for a brief posting at Newcastle University before moving to the post that was to see him to the end of his career - a professorship in Development Economics at the School of Development Studies at the University of East Anglia.

== Other noted roles ==
- Membership of the economics committee of the Economic and Social Research Council (1976-80)
- Membership of the Overseas Development Administration's economic and social committee on research (1977-92)
- Membership of the Commonwealth Scholarships Commission (1995-2001).

== Works ==
Tribe reports that following might be viewed as his major works:

1. The textbook: An Introduction To Economics For East Africa (1968). The "Samuelson of Africa".
2. The first socio-economic development plan for Cambodia (1995-96)
3. A study of small and medium industries in the Gulf States (1989)
4. A study on wages and employment in Malawi (1993)
5. A report on the agro-processing contribution to rural employment in Vietnam (1994)

Tribe identifies the common features of these works a being their "rigorous economic analysis and a focus on people and the improvement of their living standards."

== Other sources ==
Livingstone, Ian, Michael A. Tribe, John T. Thoburn, Richard Palmer-Jones (2005) Development economics and social justice: essays in honour of Ian Livingstone, Ashgate Publishing, Ltd., 2005 ISBN 0-7546-3879-0, ISBN 978-0-7546-3879-7

== Other noted works ==
Livingstone, Ian (1981) Development Economics and Policy: Readings, London, George Allen and Unwin
