= Edwin Brockholst Livingston =

American amateur historian (1852-1929)

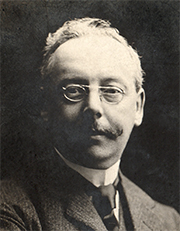
- Born: August 17, 1852; New York City, U.S.
- Died: May 14, 1929 (aged 76); Château de Montalègre, Versols-et-Lapeyre, France
- Spouse: Alice Mary Power (after 1875)
- Children: 7

Edwin Brockholst Livingston (August 17, 1852 – May 14, 1929) was an amateur historian. His lifetime work was the research and publication of the genealogy of the Scottish Livingston family of Callendar, and the offshoots of the family that sought their fortune in colonial America. These included, Robert “the Founder”, Governor William Livingston of New Jersey and his brother Philip who was a signer of the Declaration of Independence, Judge Robert R. Livingston of Clermont and his son, plus Edward Livingston, the friend and adviser of Andrew Jackson.

== Early life ==
Livingston was born on August 17, 1852, in New York City. He was the son of Jasper Livingston and Mary (née Shuttleworth) Livingston. His grandfather was Jasper Hall Livingston from Jamaica (a descendant from Philip "the signer") who had married Eliza Livingston, the daughter of judge Henry Brockholst Livingston from his first marriage to Catherine Keteltas.

== Career ==
Edwin Brockholst Livingston was a shipping insurance broker living in London.

The first publication of Edwin's research (privately printed in 1887) was limited to the early history of the family in Scotland. It was titled: The Livingstons of Callendar, and their Principal Cadets - a Family History, revised and republished in 1921. Edwin continued his research, corresponding widely including an exchange of letters with Theodore Roosevelt.

In 1910, Edwin published the next edition of his work titled: The Livingstons of Livingston Manor: being the history of that branch of the Scottish house of Callendar which settled in the English province of New York during the reign of Charles the Second; and also including an account of Robert Livingston of Albany, "The Nephew," a settler in the same province, and his principal descendants. In 1920, he published The Livingstons of Callendar and their Principal Cadets: the History of an Old Stirlingshire Family.

Edwin's final publication was in 1927 titled: The Captain of Stirling Castle James Livingston, in collaboration with James Livingston.

== Personal life ==
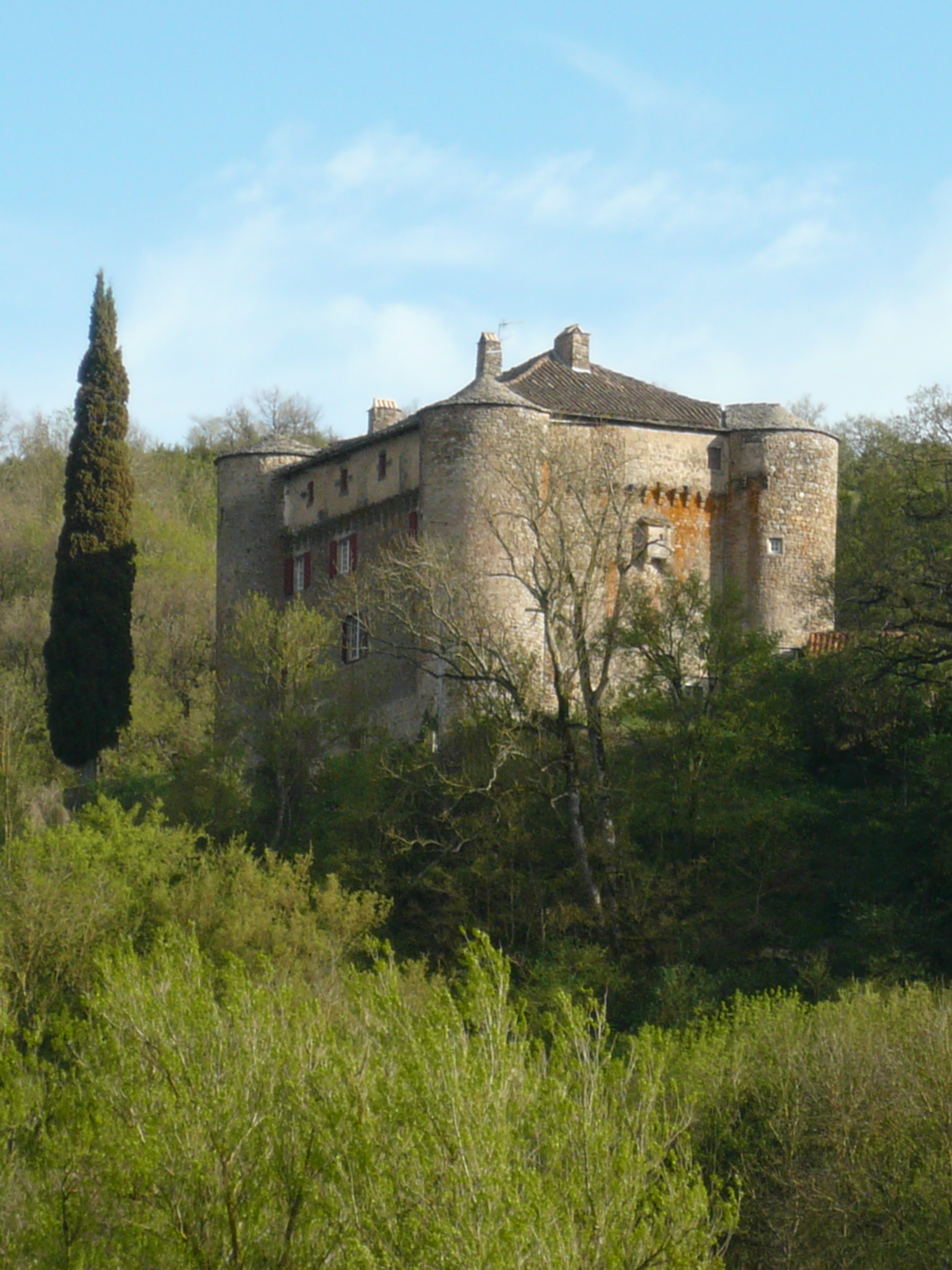
Château de Montalègre

On October 5, 1875, Edwin married Alice Mary Power (1850-1926) in Mannheim, Baden-Württemberg. She was the daughter of Irish politician Maurice Power (1811–1870), who served as a Member of Parliament for County Cork and the Lieutenant General for St Lucia, and Catherine (née Livingston) Power (b. 1815). Through her mother, Alice was a granddaughter of Judge Livingston. Together, they were the parents of:

- Cornelia Marie de la Poer Livingston (1882–1966), who first married Hubert Victor Arthur Auguste de Stuers (1879–1949) in 1906. They divorced and she married Dirk Jacob Gijsbert Jan van Pallandt (1864–1926), a relation of Baron Philip van Pallandt, on April 21, 1920, in Geneva.
- Henry Brockholst Livingston (1895-1968), who married Elizabeth Rosemary Fitzgibbon (b. 1912), the daughter of Gerald Ernest George Fitzgibbon, on May 5, 1934. They lived at the Château de Bonmont, Cheserex, Vaud, Switzerland.
- Lucinda Mary Livingston (b. 1876)
- Alice Louisa Livingston (1877-1913). Died as a nun in Vienna.
- Margaret (Daisy) Livingston (1879-1958) married Gustav P. Bissinger (d. 1945) and reverted to her family name after their divorce.
- William Livingston (b. 1884)
- Dorothy Joan Livingston (b. 1888)

Livingston died at his daughter Cornelia's residence, Château de Montalègre in Versols-et-Lapeyre, France near Geneva, on May 14, 1929.
