= Bessie Clarksone =

Scottish exemplar of godly life

- Born: 1584; Lanark
- Died: 1625 (aged 40–41); Lanark

Bessie Clarksone (1584–1625) was a Scottish exemplar of godly life whose growing faith was recorded by her minister after her death.

== Life ==
Clarksone was possibly born in Lanark in 1584 and certainly died there in 1625. She is known because of the conversations that she had with her minister William Livingstone. He published a book after her death recording the dialogue between himself and Clarksone for three and a half years prior to her death.

The book aims to present her eventual recognition of her faith although critics have noted that it appears to focus more on the intercessions of the minister (and author). The book claims to be a revised edition, but only one edition appears to have ever existed. The book is one of several published but a reviewer has felt that this is the most unconvincing book. Livingstone did not witness her death and had to rely on others to record her "victorious faith" as she "raised her eyes to heaven".

Clarksone died in Lanark in 1625, and the book by her minister was published in 1630. Only one copy of the book now exists and it is held in the British Library.
