= Livingston, Ohio =

Ghost town in Ohio, United States

Coordinates: 40.060°N 82.262°W

Livingston is a ghost town in Licking County, in the U.S. state of Ohio.

== History ==
By 1917, Livingston was described as "virtually extinct".
