= Dr. David S. Livingston House =

Historic house in Kingman, Arizona

- U.S. National Register of Historic Places
- Location within Arizona Location within the United States
- Location: 222 Topeka Street; Kingman, Arizona
- Coordinates: 35°11′15″N 114°3′17″W
- Built: 1889
- Architectural style: Colonial Revival
- MPS: Kingman MRA
- NRHP reference No.: 86001158
- Added to NRHP: May 14, 1986

Dr. David S. Livingston House is a historic house in Kingman, Arizona. The house was built in 1889. The home is of Colonial Revival style. He was an early Kingman Doctor and he was the railroads division surgeon. He later moved to Prescott in 1891. The house is on the National Register of Historic Places and the number is 86001158.

It was evaluated for National Register listing as part of a 1985 study of 63 historic resources in Kingman that led to this and many others being listed.
