= Livingstone =

Livingstone may refer to:

- Livingstone (name), a Scottish surname and a given name.
  - David Livingstone (1813–1873), Scottish physician, missionary and explorer, after whom many other Livingstones are named

== Places ==
- Livingstone Falls, on the Congo River
- Livingstone, Zambia, a city next to Victoria Falls
- Livingstone District, a district in Zambia
- Livingstone, Waikato, a suburb of Hamilton, New Zealand
- Livingstone, Otago, a settlement in New Zealand's South Island
- Livingstone Mountains, Malawi
- Shire of Livingstone, a local government area in Queensland, Australia
- Livingstone, Northern Territory, Australia
  - Livingstone Airfield

== Other uses ==
- Livingstone (film), a 1925 British silent biographical film
- Livingstone College, North Carolina
- Livingstone (constituency), a constituency of the National Assembly of Zambia

== See also ==
- David Livingstone Centre, museum in Blantyre, South Lanarkshire, Scotland
- Jonathan Livingston Seagull, a book
- Livingstonia, Malawi
- Livingston (disambiguation)
- Living stone
- Sergio Livingstone
