= Henry Brockholst Livingston =

US Supreme Court justice from 1807 to 1823

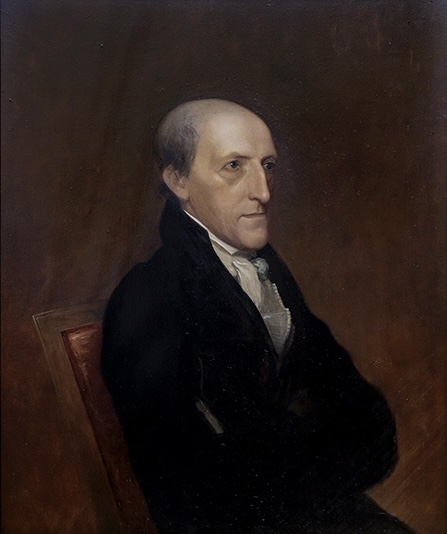
- Livingston, c. 1806-1823

Associate Justice of the Supreme Court of the United States
- In office January 20, 1807 – March 18, 1823
- Nominated by: Thomas Jefferson
- Preceded by: William Paterson
- Succeeded by: Smith Thompson

Personal details
- Born: November 25, 1757 New York City, New York, British America
- Died: March 18, 1823 (aged 65) Washington, D.C., U.S.
- Party: Democratic-Republican
- Spouse(s): Catherine Keteltas (m. 1784; died 1804) Ann Ludlow; Catherine Seaman
- Relatives: William Livingston (Father); John Jay (brother-in-law); John Symmes (brother-in-law); Maurice Power (son-in-law); Robert Livingston (uncle); Peter Van Brugh Livingston (uncle); Philip Livingston (uncle); Henry Ledyard (grandson)
- Education: Princeton University (BA)

Military service
- Allegiance: United Colonies of North America
- Branch/service: Continental Army
- Years of service: 1775–1782
- Rank: Lieutenant Colonel; Aide-de-camp
- Unit: 3rd New York Regiment
- Battles/wars: American Revolutionary War; Northern Campaign; Saratoga Campaign; Battle of Freeman's Farm; Battle of Bennington; Battle of Bemis Heights

Henry Brockholst Livingston (November 25, 1757 – March 18, 1823) was an American Revolutionary War officer, a justice of the New York Court of Appeals and eventually an associate justice of the Supreme Court of the United States.

== Early life ==
Livingston was born in New York City in 1757 to Susanna French (d. 1789) and William Livingston (1723–1790). He graduated with a Bachelor of Arts from the College of New Jersey (now Princeton University) in 1774. He inherited the family estate in New Jersey, Liberty Hall (the modern-day site of Kean University), and retained it until 1798.

== Military service ==
Livingston played a significant role in the American Revolutionary War, serving in both military and diplomatic capacities. He began his service in 1775 as a captain and aide-de-camp to General Philip Schuyler, contributing to the Northern Campaign of the war. By December 1775, Livingston was promoted to major and served in the 3rd New York Regiment, a unit of the New York Line.

In 1776 and 1777, Livingston served under General Arthur St. Clair before joining Major General Benedict Arnold as an aide-de-camp during the pivotal Saratoga Campaign. At the Battle of Freeman's Farm on September 19, 1777, Livingston actively participated in the engagement and publicly credited Arnold with the American victory, which caused tension with General Horatio Gates, commander of the Northern Army. After the battle, Livingston left the camp on September 26, 1777, to rejoin General Schuyler in Albany.

Livingston's bravery and contributions did not go unnoticed. On October 4, 1777, eight days after leaving Saratoga, the Continental Congress officially promoted him to lieutenant colonel, recognizing his merit and service to the Continental Army. Earlier that year, he had delivered dispatches to the Continental Congress announcing the Continental Army's victory at the Battle of Bennington in August 1777. Livingston was also present at the surrender of British General John Burgoyne's army at Saratoga, a decisive moment in the war.

In 1779, Livingston was granted a leave of absence to be the private secretary for his brother-in-law, John Jay, the U.S. Minister to Spain. During this diplomatic mission, Livingston supported American efforts to secure Spanish assistance for the war. On his return voyage to America in 1782, Livingston was captured at sea by the British and imprisoned in New York City. He was released on parole later that year. Following his release, he left military service and began studying law in the law office of Peter Yates in Albany.

== Legal career ==
After leaving the military, Livingston read law and was admitted to the bar in 1783. He was in private practice in New York City from 1783 to 1802, and was a counsel for the defense in the landmark case of Rutgers v. Waddington (1784). He was an Original Member of the Society of the Cincinnati. Livingston served as one of three defense attorneys, alongside Alexander Hamilton and Aaron Burr, in the trial of Levi Weeks for the murder of Elma Sands.

Chief Justice John Marshall

=== Judicial career ===
From 1802 to 1807, Livingston served as a justice of the Supreme Court of New York, where he authored a famous dissent in the 1805 case of Pierson v. Post.

Two years later, on November 10, 1806, Livingston received a recess appointment to the Supreme Court of the United States from Thomas Jefferson, to a seat vacated by William Paterson. Formally nominated on December 15, 1806, as Jefferson's second nominee, Livingston was confirmed by the United States Senate on December 17, 1806, and was sworn into office on January 20, 1807. He served on the Supreme Court from then until his death in 1823. During his Supreme Court tenure, Livingston's votes and opinions often followed the lead of Chief Justice John Marshall. In that era, Supreme Court justices were required to ride a circuit; in Justice Livingston's case, he presided over cases in New York State.

=== Virginia-New York Alliance ===
Prior to his appointment to the U.S. Supreme Court, Livingston served as a judge for the State Supreme Court of New York, a member of the New York State Assembly, and an immensely prominent political activist. Due to family ties, Livingston's allegiance to the Democratic-Republican party soon faded. Essentially, Livingston rebelled and goaded the Federalists to an enormous extent. With members consisting of Aaron Burr, Robert R. Livingston, and Edward Livingston (both cousins of Brockholst), Livingston became one of the few emerging from a compact political faction in New York to form an alliance with Jefferson's supporters in Virginia. This became known as the Virginia-New York alliance, which proved to be vital in Jefferson's 1800–1801 election.

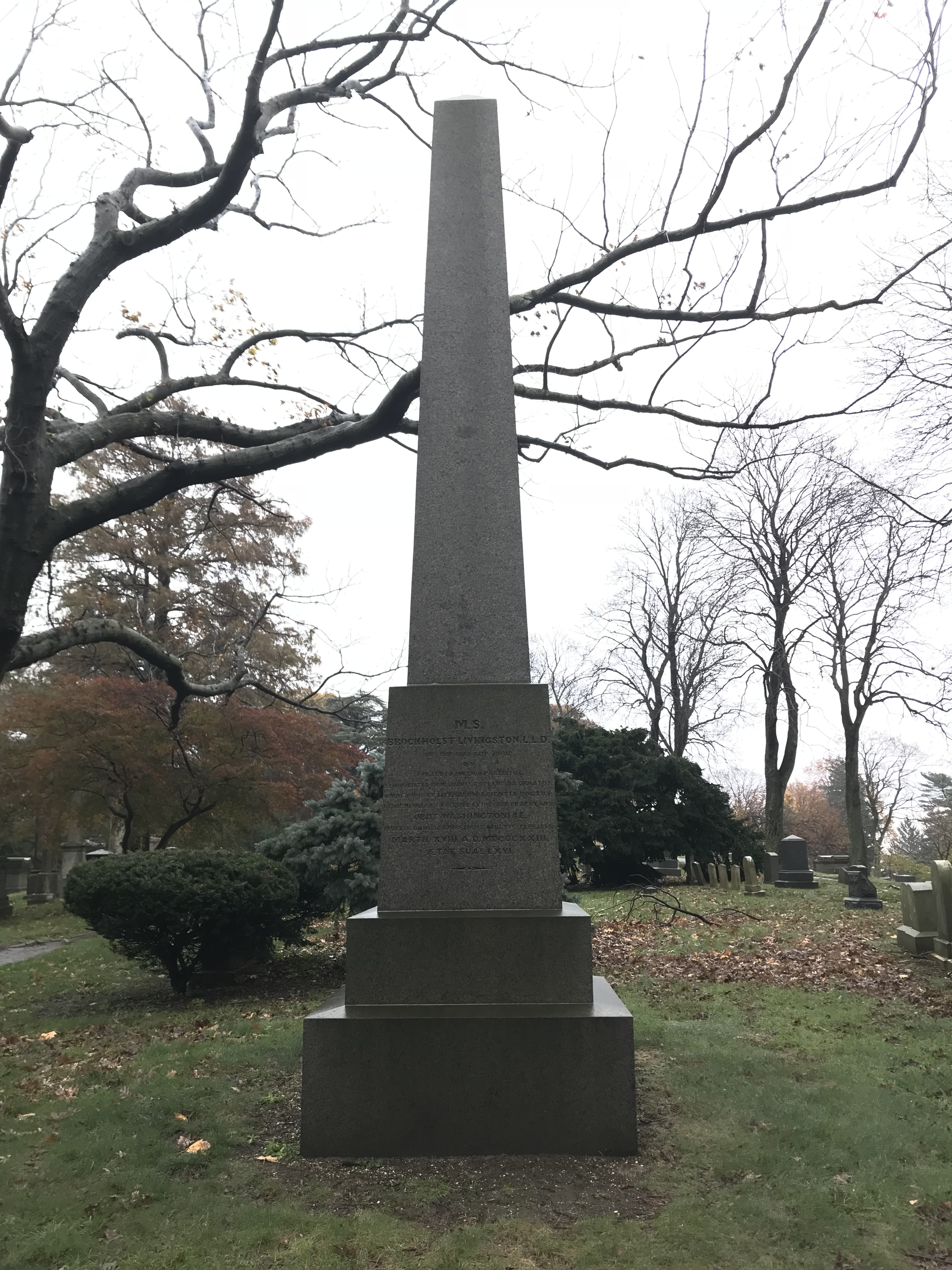
Livingston's gravesite

=== Later years and death ===
Livingston was elected a member of the American Antiquarian Society in 1814.

Livingston died in Washington, D.C. His remains are interred at Green-Wood Cemetery in Brooklyn, New York.

== Family ==
Coat of Arms of Henry Brockholst Livingston

Livingston's paternal uncles were Robert Livingston (1708–1790), Peter Van Brugh Livingston (1710–1792), Philip Livingston (1716–1778), and his paternal grandparents were Philip Livingston (1686–1749), the 2nd Lord of Livingston Manor, and Catherine Van Brugh, the only child of Albany mayor Pieter Van Brugh (1666–1740).

His sister, Sarah Van Brugh Livingston (1756–1802), married John Jay (1745–1829) who was a diplomat, one of the Founding Fathers of the United States, signatory of the Treaty of Paris, the second governor of New York, and the first chief justice of the United States, in 1774.

Another sister, Susannah Livingston (1748–1840), married John Cleves Symmes (1742–1814), who was a delegate to the Continental Congress from New Jersey, and later a pioneer in the Northwest Territory. Her stepdaughter Anna Symmes, Symmes' daughter from a previous marriage, married eventual president William Henry Harrison, and was the grandmother of President Benjamin Harrison.

=== Marriages and children ===
Livingston married three times. He first married Catherine Keteltas (1761–1804), the daughter of Peter Keteltas and Elizabeth Van Zandt, on December 2, 1784. He and Catherine were the parents of:

- Eliza Livingston (1786–1860), who married Jasper Hall Livingston (1780–1835), the son of Philip Philip Livingston (1741–1787)
- Susan French Livingston (1789–1864), who married Benjamin Ledyard (1779–1812).
- Catherine Augusta Livingston (b. c. 1790), who married Archibald McVicker (1785–1849)
- Robert C. Livingston (b. c. 1793)

After his first wife's death in 1804, he married Ann N. Ludlow (1775–1815), the daughter of Gabriel Henry Ludlow and Ann Williams. Together, they were the parents of:

- Carroll Livingston (1805–1867), who married Cornelia Livingston.
- Anson Livingston (1807–1873), who married Anne Greenleaf Livingston (1809–1887), daughter of Henry Walter Livingston (1768–1810)

After his second wife's death in 1815, he married Catherine Seaman (1775–1859), the daughter of Edward Seaman and the widow of Capt. John Kortright. Together, Henry and Catherine were the parents of:

- Jasper Hall Livingston (1815–1900), a twin, who married Matilda Anne Cecila Morris, the youngest daughter of Sir John Morris, 2nd Baronet of Clasemont, in 1851.
- Catherine Louise Livingston (b. 1815–1890), a twin, who married Maurice Power (1811–1870), an Irish MP for County Cork who served as lieutenant governor for St. Lucia.
- Henry Brockholst Livingston (1819–1892), who married Marianna Gribaldo and resided in Italy.

=== Descendants ===
Through his daughter Eliza, he was the great-grandfather of Edwin Brockholst Livingston (1852–1929), a historian.

Through his daughter, Susan, he was the grandfather of Henry Brockholst Ledyard (1812–1880) and great-grandfather of Henry Brockholst Ledyard Jr. (1844–1921) and Lewis Cass Ledyard (1851–1932).

Through his daughter, Catherine McVicker, he was the grandfather of Brockholst McVicker (1810–1883) and Archibald McVicker (1816–1904).

Through his daughter, Catherine Power, he was the grandfather of: Brockholst Livingston Power, John Livingston Power, and Alice Livingston Power (who married her cousin, Edwin).

Through his son, Henry, he was the grandfather of Oscar Enrico Federico Livingston (1875–1945).

Through his son Anson, he was the grandfather of Ludlow Livingston (1838–1873), Mary Allen Livingston Harrison (1830–1921) and Ann Ludlow Livingston (1832–1913).

== See also ==
- Demographics of the Supreme Court of the United States
- List of justices of the Supreme Court of the United States
- List of United States Supreme Court justices by time in office
- United States Supreme Court cases during the Marshall Court

== Sources ==
- "Brockholst Livingston," in Princetonians, 1769-1775 (Princeton, N.J.: Princeton University Press, 1980), 397–407.

Legal offices
Preceded by William Paterson	Associate Justice of the Supreme Court of the United States; 1807–1823	Succeeded by Smith Thompson
