= Liberty Hall (New Jersey) =

- Governor William Livingston House
- U.S. National Register of Historic Places
- U.S. National Historic Landmark
- New Jersey Register of Historic Places
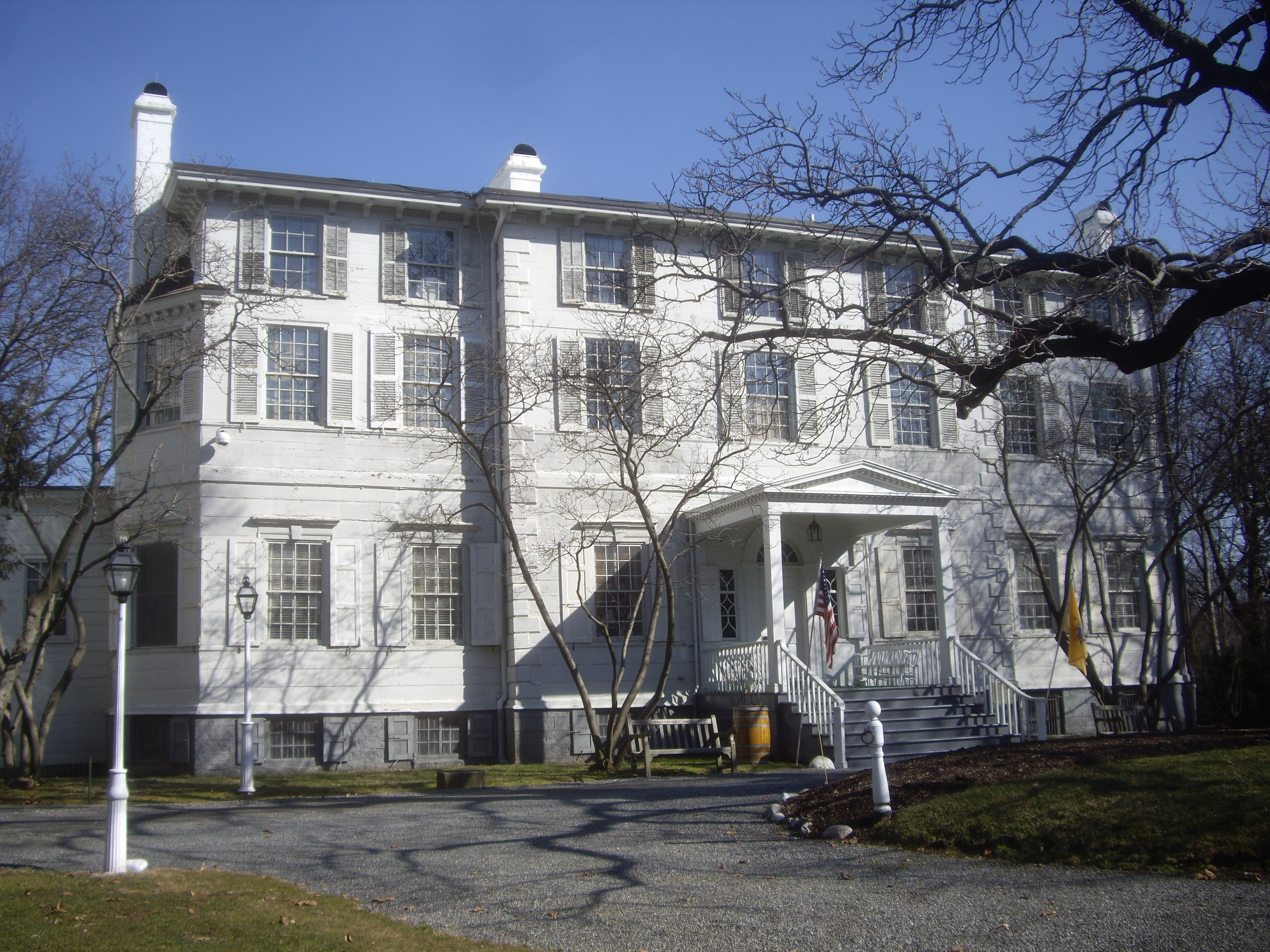

- Location within Union County, New Jersey Location within New Jersey Location within the United States
- Location: Morris and North Avenues, Union, New Jersey
- Coordinates: 40°40′42″N 74°13′43″W
- Area: 140 acres (57 ha)
- Built: 1772
- NRHP reference No.: 72000807
- NJRHP No.: 2732

Significant dates
- Added to NRHP: November 28, 1972
- Designated NHL: November 28, 1972
- Designated NJRHP: November 28, 1972

Liberty Hall, also known as the Governor William Livingston House, located on Morris Avenue in Union, Union County, New Jersey, United States, is a historic home where many leading influential people lived. It was documented by the Historic American Buildings Survey (HABS) in 1938. The house was added to the National Register of Historic Places as a National Historic Landmark on November 28, 1972, for its significance in politics and government. It is now the Liberty Hall Museum.

Originally a fourteen-room Georgian-style house, it was built in 1772. Liberty Hall stands today as a fifty-room Victorian Italianate mansion. Liberty Hall has been home to many historical figures and was the home of William Livingston, the first Governor of New Jersey, who served from 1776 to 1790; United States Supreme Court Justice Henry Brockholst Livingston; the Kean political dynasty, including Susan Livingston Kean, widow of Continental Congress delegate John Kean, United States Senator and Congressman John Kean, and Captain John Kean, son of United States Senator Hamilton Fish Kean; and, in its first year of occupancy, future Treasury Secretary Alexander Hamilton. Liberty Hall has had visitors of such stature as George Washington, Martha Washington, Lewis Morris, Marquis de Lafayette, Elias Boudinot, and John Jay, the latter of whom was married there.

The Liberty Hall Museum is located on the Liberty Hall Campus of Kean University in Union, New Jersey between the campus' Main Campus in Union and East Campus in Hillside, New Jersey.

== History ==
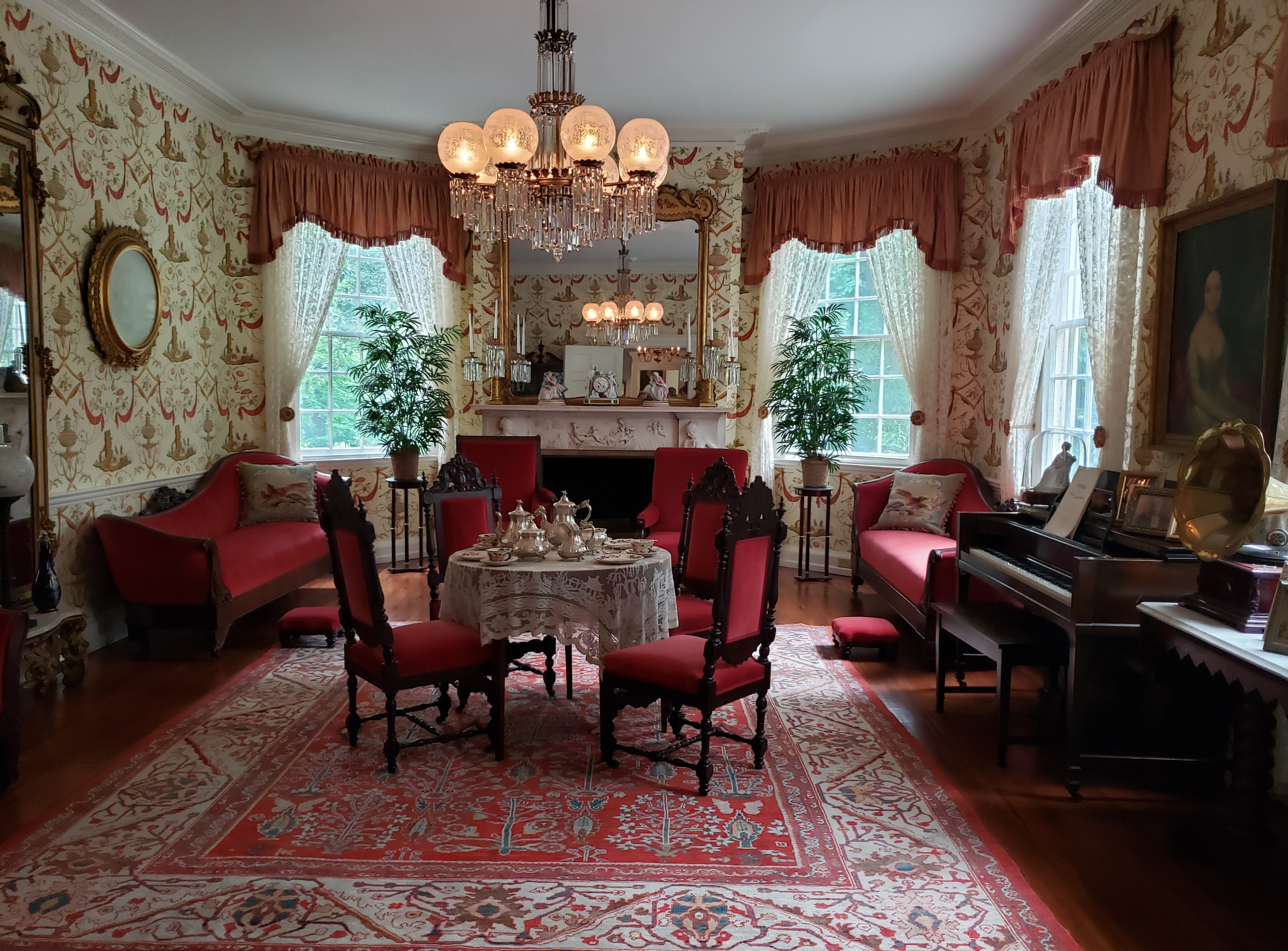
Sitting room in the Liberty Hall

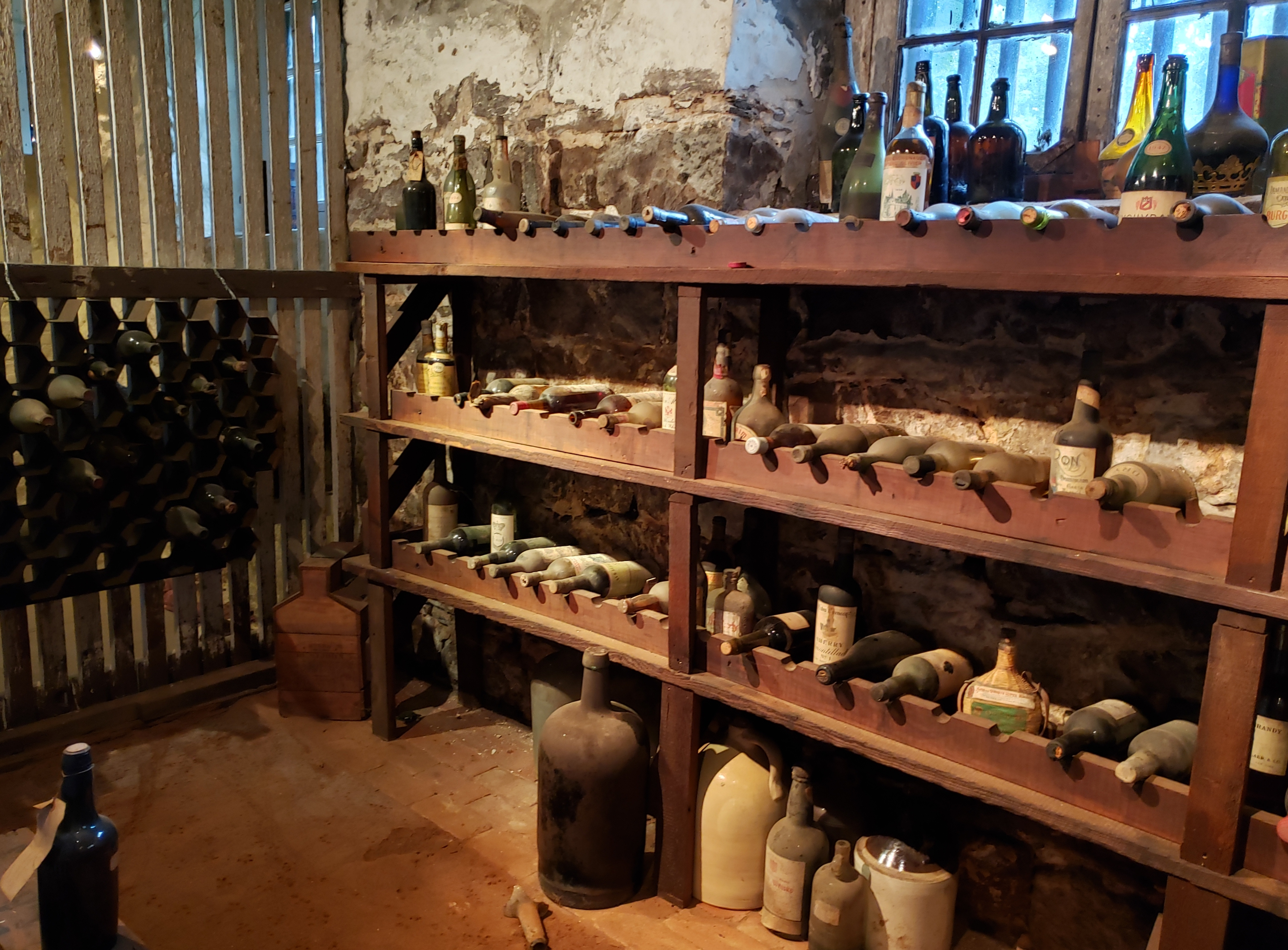
Wine cellar

=== The Livingstons ===
The Liberty Hall Museum was built as a Georgian-style house in 1772 by William Livingston, a lawyer who would go on to become a member of the First and Second Continental Congress, founding father, a signatory of the Constitution, and the first Governor of the State of New Jersey. During the first year of occupancy Alexander Hamilton, later the first Secretary of the Treasury, resided with Livingston. The house was built on a 120-acre property purchased by Livingston in 1760 in then-Elizabethtown, close to New York, New York where Livingston worked. The Livingston family moved into Liberty Hall full-time in 1773. The gardens and orchards first planted by Governor Livingston are still evident on the museum grounds today.

Guests at Liberty Hall included George Washington, Martha Washington, Lewis Morris, Marquis de Lafayette and Elias Boudinot and the house was the site of the marriage of one of Livingston's daughters to John Jay, the first Chief Justice of the United States Supreme Court. During the American Revolutionary War, in which Livingston fought, the house was damaged by both American and British forces. After the war Livingston returned to the house and lived there until his 1790 death. Following the deaths of Governor Livingston and his wife, Susannah French Livingston, their son Henry Brockholst Livingston, a future United States Supreme Court Justice, inherited the home. In 1798 the home was purchased by George Belasise, Lord Bolingbroke and wife Isabella, who continued the Livingstons' tradition of enhancing the agriculture and grounds of Liberty Hall.

=== The Keans ===
In 1811 Liberty Hall was purchased by Peter Kean in trust for his mother Susan Livingston Kean Niemcewicz, a niece of William and Susannah Livingston (women could not own property in their own name in the United States until the second half of the nineteenth century). Susan's first husband, John Kean of South Carolina, had been a delegate to the Continental Congress who supported ratification of the United States Constitution in South Carolina, was the first cashier of the Bank of the United States and had been held prisoner during the American Revolution (a consequential respiratory disease lead to his death at age thirty-nine). Susan Livingston changed the name of Liberty Hall to Ursino, the name of her Polish second husband Count Julian Niemcewicz's Polish estate (Niemcewicz had returned to Poland after Napoleon's successful campaigns, having initially been exiled due to his role in unsuccessfully fighting for independence from the Russians.)

Colonel Peter Kean, the only son of Susan and John Kean, and his wife Sarah Sabina Morris, granddaughter of Lewis Morris, the first royal governor of New Jersey inherited Liberty Hall, followed by their son Colonel John Kean II. John Kean II lived at Liberty Hall for 60 years and made the most significant changes to the house and property, expanding the house to its current structure as a 50-room Victorian Italianate structure for the main reason of accommodating his large family, and introduced modern amenities such as running water, gravity hot-air heating, and gas lighting. The house passed to the oldest son of John and Lucinetta Halsted Kean, John, a two-term Congressman and Senator from New Jersey who continued to live and host affairs at Liberty Hall when home.

Captain John Kean, son of United States Senator Hamilton Fish Kean and Katharine Winthrop Kean and nephew of Senator John Kean inherited the house upon his uncle's death and resided there with his wife, Mary Alice Barney after 1932. Mary Alice Kean motivated the restoration of Liberty Hall and other historic homes and was a researcher of Kean family history. Mary Alice Kean was the final resident of Liberty Hall before it became Liberty Hall Museum.

== The structure ==
The building, in three sections, was built of frame over an elevated stone basement. The original two-story central portion had a modified gambrel roof and two interior chimneys and was flanked by one-story wings, built on the main axis, with polyangular ends, hipped roofs, and end chimneys. Exterior walls were flushboarded. Quoins marked the corners of the central section, and flat, key-blocked cornices topped the first-story windows. In 1789 a second story was added to the west wing. In 1870 a third story was superimposed on the west wing and central section, and the second and third stories on the east wing. The rooms and tower at the northwest corner and the rooms at the northeast corner were also constructed at that time, as well as a gabled roof with bracketed eaves over the entire building. Except for the additional levels, the south, or front, elevation retains its original appearance. Open-string steps, whose balusters are plain, lead to the pedimented front porch. A fanlight surmounts the paneled door. Shutters are paneled on the first floor and louvered on the second. Third-story windows lack any such adornment. The cornice of the porch, as well as its triangular pediment, are dentiled. The floor plan and interior trim of the 18th-century portion of the mansion remain essentially intact within the larger present structure. The elaborate mantels date from the 19th century. While a number of rooms and their furnishings have been restored to their original condition, others have been added to meet the changing needs of different generations of the Kean family, and modifications have been made to add modern heating and plumbing systems.

== National Landmark ==
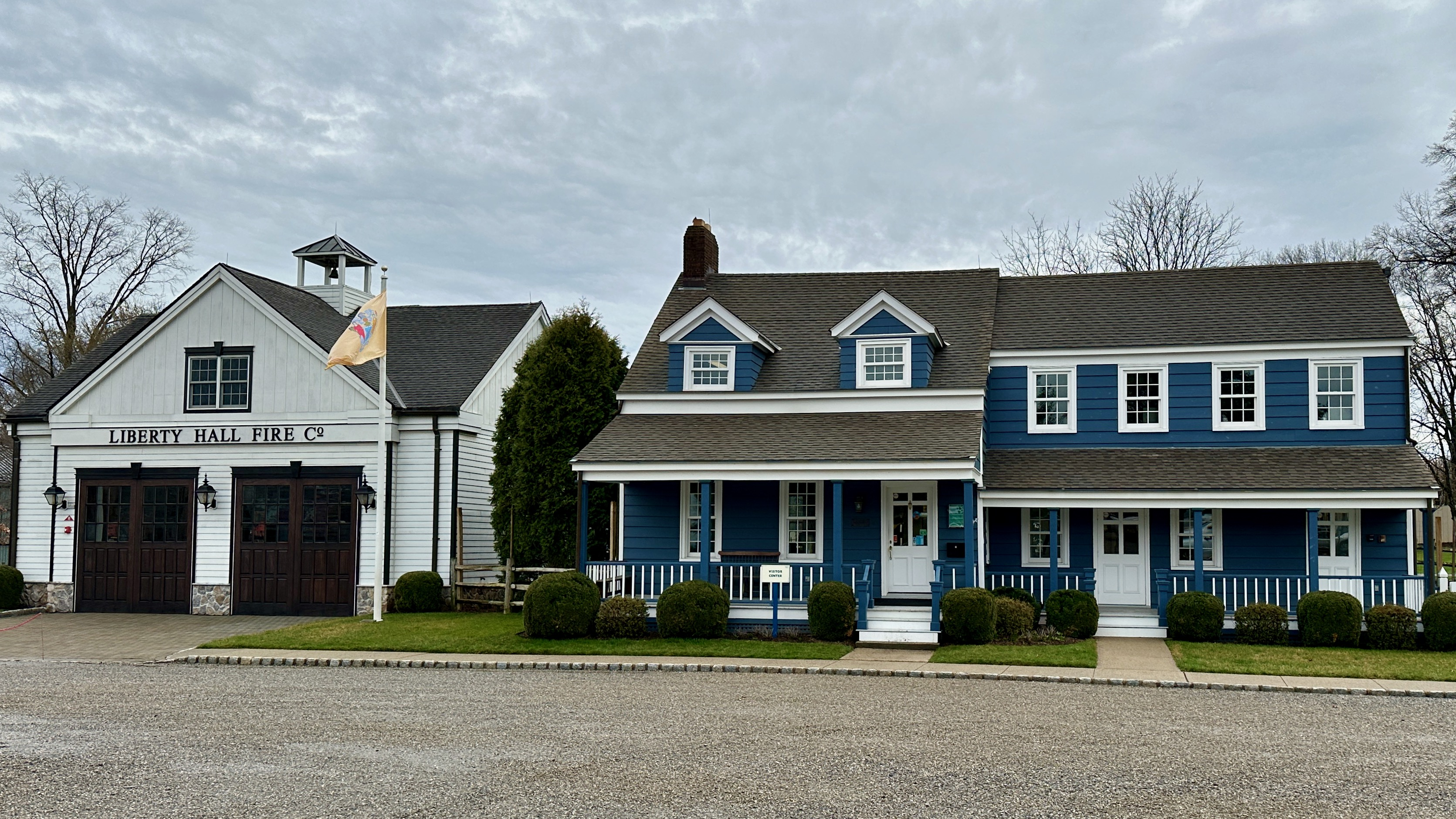
Liberty Hall Fire Co. and Visitor Center

In 1949 Mary Alice Kean began to transform the house into a museum and in 1974 Mrs. Kean restored the name "Liberty Hall" to the house. The museum is listed on the National Register of Historic Places and is a National Historic Landmark. The building is part of Kean University and is located on the Liberty Hall Campus at Kean. Liberty Hall houses collections of furniture, clothing, manuscripts, books, portraits, pictures, and other historical artifacts, including a signed letter from George Washington, a pre-census, population count, and an invitation to Abraham Lincoln's inaugural. The Liberty Hall was one of the important points of interest of the "Young Immigrant Hamilton Tour" as part of the CelebrateHAMILTON 2014 hosted by the Alexander Hamilton Awareness Society.

== See also ==
- National Register of Historic Places listings in Union County, New Jersey
