= Burton Edward Livingston =

American plant physiologist (1875–1948)

- Born: February 9, 1875; Grand Rapids, Michigan
- Died: February 8, 1948 (aged 72)
- Education: University of Chicago; University of Michigan
- Scientific career
- Fields: Plant physiology
- Workplaces: University of Chicago; Johns Hopkins University
- Thesis: (1902)
- Doctoral students: Bob Marshall

Burton Edward Livingston (February 9, 1875 – February 8, 1948) was an American plant physiologist, born at Grand Rapids, Michigan. He was educated at the University of Michigan (B.S., 1898) and the University of Chicago (Ph.D., 1902), where he worked as an assistant from 1899 to 1905. He published Róle of Diffusion and Osmotic Pressure in Plants (1903). In 1913, Livingston became the professor of plant physiology at Johns Hopkins University. He was elected to the American Academy of Arts and Sciences in 1914. He also served on the board of trustees for Science Service, now known as the Society for Science and the Public, from 1930 to 1937. He was elected to the American Philosophical Society in 1933.
