= William Livingston =

American Founding Father and politician (1723–1790)

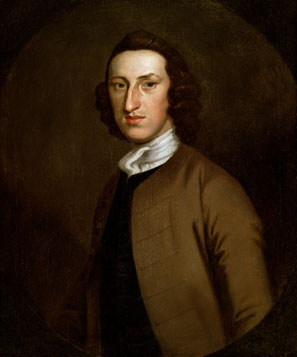
- Portrait by John Wollaston, c. 1750.

1st Governor of New Jersey
- In office August 31, 1776 – July 25, 1790
- Preceded by: William Franklin as Royal Governor
- Succeeded by: Elisha Lawrence; Acting Governor

Member of the New York General Assembly
- In office 1759–1761
- Preceded by: Robert Livingston
- Succeeded by: Peter R. Livingston

Personal details
- Born: November 30, 1723 Albany, Province of New York, British America
- Died: July 25, 1790 (aged 66) Elizabeth, New Jersey, U.S.
- Resting place: Green-Wood Cemetery, Brooklyn, New York City
- Party: Federalist
- Spouse: Susannah French (m. 1745; died 1789)
- Children: 13, including Sarah, Brockholst
- Parent(s): Philip Livingston; Catherine Van Brugh
- Relatives: See Livingston family
- Education: Yale College

William Livingston (November 30, 1723 – July 25, 1790) was an American politician and lawyer who served as the first governor of New Jersey (1776–1790) during the American Revolutionary War. As a New Jersey representative in the Continental Congress, he signed the Continental Association and the United States Constitution. He is one of the Founding Fathers of the United States and a founding father of New Jersey.

== Early life and education ==
William Livingston's coat of arms

Livingston was born in Albany in the Province of New York on November 30, 1723. He was the son of Philip Livingston (1686–1749), the 2nd Lord of Livingston Manor, and Catherine Van Brugh, the only child of Albany mayor Pieter Van Brugh. His older siblings included Robert Livingston (1708–1790), 3rd Lord of Livingston Manor, Peter Van Brugh Livingston (1710–1792), New York State Treasurer, and Philip Livingston (1716–1778), a member of the New York State Senate.

Livingston received his early education from local schools and tutors. At age 13, he was sent to live for a year and prepare for college with the Anglican missionary catechist and Yale College graduate Henry Barclay who lived among the Iroquois in the Mohawk Valley at Fort Hunter. Livingston enrolled at Yale in 1737 and graduated in 1741. He went on to New York City, where he studied law and became a law clerk for the eminent lawyer James Alexander. He left Alexander's office in the spring of 1746 before finishing his apprenticeship because of a disagreement and joined the office of William Smith Sr.

== Career in New York ==
He became a lawyer in 1748 and began his practice in New York City. In 1752, he founded a weekly journal, the Independent Reflector, along with fellow Presbyterian lawyers William Smith Jr., the son of his law teacher, and John Morin Scott. The three were called by contemporaries "The Triumvirate". The Reflector was New York's first serial non-newspaper publication and the only one being published in British North America at the time. It was used as a platform by the political upstate Presbyterian land-owning "country faction" led by Livingston for challenging the powerful downstate Anglican and Dutch Reformed merchant or "popular faction" led by Chief Justice James De Lancey. Most notably, the Triumvirate attacked the founding of King's College (later renamed as Columbia University) as a conspiracy by Anglicans to install a bishop in America, including his former tutor Rev. Henry Barclay, rector of Trinity Church, and his former law teacher James Alexander.

Publication of the Reflector ceased with the fifty-second issue in late 1753 after political pressure was brought to bear upon its printer, James Parker, but Livingston and his allies continued to attack the college over the next year with columns in newspapers. By raising divisive issues, he managed to divert half the funds raised by a state lottery for the college to fund the construction of a new jail and a detention house for sailors from diseased ships. In July 1754, King's College was defiantly opened under its first president, Samuel Johnson, and on October 31, 1754, King George III granted a charter to the institution.

Livingston remained politically active and was elected to the American Philosophical Society in 1768 and served one term in the New York General Assembly until his political allies lost power in 1769 and was replaced by his nephew, Peter Robert Livingston, the eldest surviving son of his brother Robert.

== Career in New Jersey ==
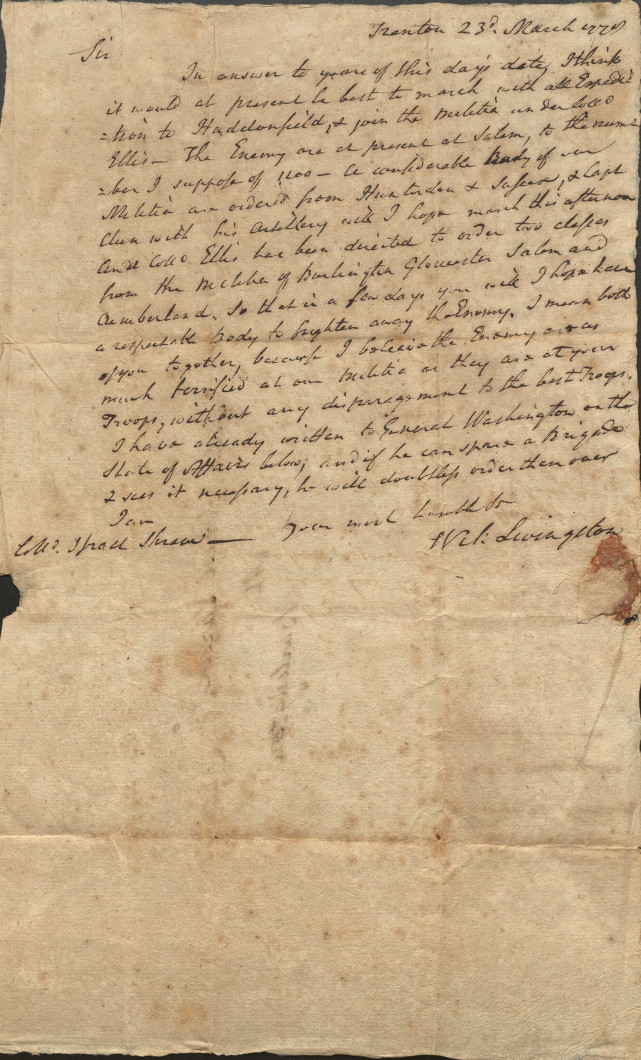
A March 23, 1778, letter from Governor Livingston to Israel Shreve

In 1772, he moved to Elizabethtown in the colonial-era Province of New Jersey, where he rented a house in town. A young Alexander Hamilton lived with Livingston for at least the winter while he attended Francis Barber's grammar school.

Livingston started construction of a large country home to house his growing family. The house, known as Liberty Hall, still stands. After attaining considerable influence among the local patriots, Livingston was elected to serve as one of New Jersey's delegates to the Continental Congress in Philadelphia, where he served from July 1774 to June 1776. New Jersey's Provincial Congress declined to reappoint him to the Second Continental Congress, however, since he did not favor immediate independence, so he was not a signatory to the Declaration of Independence that was unanimously adopted on July 4, 1776. William Livingston's older brother, Philip Livingston, who remained as a strong member of the New York delegation, did become one of the 56 signers.

Meanwhile, the New Jersey Provincial Congress offered William Livingston command of its state's militia, which he declined. When William Livingston returned to New Jersey from Philadelphia in the summer of 1776, he relied on his October 1775 commission as a brigadier general of the New Jersey Militia.

In August 1776, he was elected Governor of New Jersey. Between 1776 and 1779, the family lived in Parsippany at the Bowers–Livingston–Osborn House for safety from local Loyalists. Liberty Hall was frequently visited by British forces since there was a substantial reward for Livingston's capture. One attempt to kidnap him took place in mid-June 1779. False information about Livingston visiting his second home in Parsippany resulted in a raid by Loyalists and their subsequent capture. The Loyalist mayor of New York City, and a distant cousin through the Schuyler family, David Mathews, was suspected by being behind the attempted capture of Livingston. The family returned to Liberty Hall in 1779 to begin restoring their looted home. He was elected a fellow of the American Academy of Arts and Sciences in 1782.

=== Later years ===
Livingston joined the New Jersey Delegation to the 1787 Constitutional Convention in Philadelphia and was one of the signers of the U.S. Constitution. He was appointed United States Minister to the Netherlands in 1788 by the U.S. Congress, but turned down the opportunity. He continued to be reelected governor of New Jersey each year until his death in 1790.

== Personal life ==
Livingston married Susannah French (1723–1789) in New Jersey in 1745. She was the daughter of landowner Philip French III and Susanna (née Brockholst) French. Her paternal grandparents were Phillip French, the 27th mayor of New York City, and Annetje (née Philipse) French (the daughter of Frederick Philipse). Her maternal grandparents were Susanna Maria Brockholst and Anthony Brockholst, an acting governor of colonial New York under Sir Edmund Andros. They had 13 children, including:

- Livingston (1746–1746), a son who died in infancy.
- Livingston (1747–1747), a son who died in infancy.
- Susannah Livingston (1748–1840), who married John Cleves Symmes (1742–1814) in 1780 and became the stepmother-in-law of President William Henry Harrison.
- Catherine Livingston (1751–1813), who married Matthew Ridley (1746–1789), and later, her cousin John Livingston (1750–1822), son of Robert Livingston.
- Mary Livingston (born 1753), who married James Linn in May 1771.
- William Livingston Jr. (1754–1817), who married Mary Lennington.
- Philip Van Brugh Livingston (born 1755), who died unmarried.
- Sarah Van Brugh Livingston (1756–1802), who married John Jay (1745–1829).
- Henry Brockholst Livingston (1757–1823), an Associate Justice of the Supreme Court of the United States who married 3 times.
- Judith Livingston (1758–1843), who married John W. Watkins, an attorney.
- Philip French Livingston (born 1760), who drowned in the Hackensack River.
- John Lawrence Livingston (1762–1781), who died at sea aboard the USS Saratoga.
- Elizabeth Clarkson Livingston (1764–1765), who died young.

=== Descendants ===
Livingston's daughter, Sarah, was born in 1756 and was educated at home in penmanship, English grammar, the Bible, and classic literature. At a time when women were usually relegated to the kitchen, she was brought up to be politically aware, even serving at times as her father's secretary. Sarah, at the age of 17, married John Jay. Sarah accompanied Jay to Spain and then Paris, where he, along with John Adams, Benjamin Franklin, and Henry Laurens, negotiated the Treaty of Paris in 1783. She is credited with writing the celebratory Treaty of Paris dinner toast. When Sarah and John returned to New York, Jay was appointed Secretary of Foreign Affairs, and her Parisian training came in handy, as she and her husband established the custom of weekly dinners for the diplomatic corps and other guests in the then-capital city of New York City. Sarah served in her hospitality role as the wife of the first Chief Justice of the United States and First Lady of New York.

Among the other prominent descendants of William Livingston were Julia Kean, wife of United States Secretary of State and New York Governor Hamilton Fish, a descendant of Peter Stuyvesant, the last Dutch Director-General of New Amsterdam; Thomas Kean, the 48th Governor of New Jersey and the grand-nephew of Hamilton Fish; Edwin Brockholst Livingston, a historian; and Henry Brockholst Ledyard, mayor of Detroit.

=== Death and legacy ===
Livingston died on July 25, 1790, in Elizabeth, New Jersey, and was originally buried at Trinity Church in Manhattan, but on May 7, 1844, was reinterred at Green-Wood Cemetery in Brooklyn.

In 1747, Livingston wrote and published a long pastoral poem entitled, "Philosophic Solitude, or the Choice of a Rural Life". One of the first successful original poems written by an American colonist, it was anthologized numerous times into the 19th century. In 1754, Livingston also played a key role in founding the New York Society Library, which is still in existence over a quarter of a millennium later. Livingston also authored a commentary upon the government of England in comparison to the United States Constitution, titled 'Examen du Gouvernement d’Angleterre comparé aux Constitutions des Etats-Unis', which was cited approvingly by Emmanuel-Joseph Sieyès in his pamphlet 'What Is the Third Estate?'.

Livingston, New Jersey in Essex County, New Jersey, Governor Livingston High School in Berkeley Heights, New Jersey, and the Livingston campus at Rutgers University were each named in his honor.

== See also ==
- Livingston family
- Liberty Boys

Political offices
Preceded by William Franklin; Royal Governor	Governor of New Jersey; 1776–1790	Succeeded by Elisha Lawrence; Acting Governor
