= Jamie Livingston =

American photographer (1956–1997)

- Livingston in 1983
- Born: Jamie Livingston; October 25, 1956; New York City, U.S.
- Died: October 25, 1997 (aged 41); New York City, U.S.
- Occupations: Photographer, film-maker, circus performer
- Website: http://photooftheday.hughcrawford.com/

Jamie Livingston (October 25, 1956 – October 25, 1997) was a New York-based photographer, film-maker and circus performer. Between March 31, 1979, and October 25, 1997, the day of his death, he took a single picture nearly every day with a Polaroid SX-70 camera.

Livingston's 'Polaroid a Day' photographic diary started at Bard College and though 86 photos have gone missing from the collection, 6,697 Polaroids remain. The collection, dated in sequence, has been organized by his friends Hugh Crawford and Betsy Reid into an exhibit at the Bertelsmann Campus Center at Bard College called "Photo of the Day", which opened in 2007. By the next year, the pictures were hosted online and became a popular discovery of several online blogs.

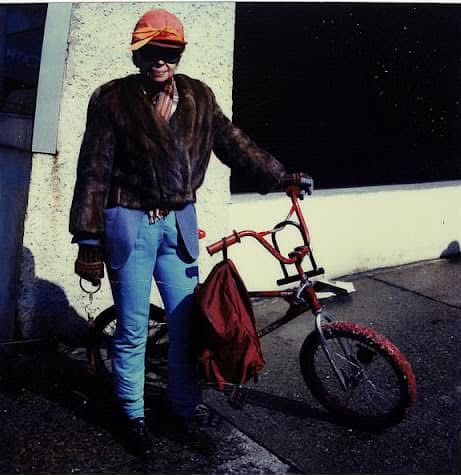
Helen Livingston Broome, Mother of photographer Jamie Livingston

== Biography ==
Livingston was a member of Chris Wangro's circus troupe The Janus Circus founded by Wangro at Bard College with other Bard Alumni including Zeena Parkins. He also worked as a cinematographer and editor of music videos for MTV, as well as working on advertisements with Nike.

In 1979, Livingston received a Polaroid camera and after a few weeks noticed that he was taking about one photo a day, which subsequently evolved into the Polaroid a Day project.

Livingston's Polaroid a Day charted his experiences with a brain tumor, and his subsequent engagement and marriage. Crawford cited the "everyman quality to the photographs" as part of their appeal, with the collection documenting everything from Livingston's lunch that day to the discarded Kodak and Polaroid packaging in a bin to TV screens showing presidents Carter, Reagan and Clinton. Because Livingston took only one picture and kept it regardless, the day-to-day often took precedence over more unusual subjects. His photographs in and out of hospital continued up until the day of his death.
