= Charles Livingston (American football) =

American football player and coach

Playing career
- 1889–1990: Fordham

Coaching career (HC unless noted)
- 1888: Fordham

Head coaching record
- Overall: 3–3

Charles Livingston was an American college football player and coach. He was the head football coach at Fordham University for one season in 1888, compiling a record of 3–3.

== Head coaching record ==
Year	Team	Overall	Conference	Standing	Bowl/playoffs
Fordham (Independent) (1888)
1888	Fordham	3–3			
Fordham:		3–3			
Total:		3–3			
