= Margaret Phipps Boegner =

- Born: November 17, 1906
- Died: September 16, 2006 (aged 99)
- Occupation: philanthropist
- Spouses: J. Gordon Douglas Jr.; Etienne Boegner
- Children: 2
- Parent(s): John Shaffer Phipps; Margarita Celia Grace

Margaret Phipps Boegner (November 17, 1906 – September 16, 2006) was an American heiress and philanthropist.

== Biography ==
=== Early life ===
Margaret Helen Phipps was born on November 17, 1906. Her father was John Shaffer Phipps (1874–1958) and her mother, Margarita Celia Grace (1876-1957). She had three brothers, John H. H. Phipps, Michael Grace Phipps (1910–1973) and Hubert Beaumont Phipps (1906–1969). Her paternal grandfather was Henry Phipps Jr. (1839–1930) and her maternal grandfather was Michael P. Grace (1842–1920). She grew up at Old Westbury Gardens in Old Westbury, New York.

=== Philanthropy ===
After her parents' deaths in 1957 and 1958, she developed the Old Westbury Gardens and decided to open her family residence to the public. She became Founder and Chairperson of the Old Westbury Gardens non-profit organization.

She was featured in an episode of America's Castles.

=== Personal life ===
She married J. Gordon Douglas Jr. in 1930. They had a son and a daughter:

- J. Gordon Douglas III.
- Dita Amory Douglas Naylor-Leyland (married Alick David Yorke Naylor-Leyland (1929–1991), son of Sir Albert Edward Herbert Naylor-Leyland, 2nd Baronet (1890–1952) of the Naylor-Leyland baronets; they have one son: Nicholas Edward Naylor-Leyland).

They divorced in 1947.

In 1951, she married Etienne Boegner, a French businessman and diplomat, and the son of Marc Boegner (1881–1970), a prominent member of the French Resistance and the first President of the Protestant Federation of France. He died in 1985.

She died in 2006. On June 30, 2010, some of her jewels were sold in an auction house in East Moriches, New York.

== Bibliography ==
- Peggie Phipps Boegner, Richard Gachot, Halcyon Days: An American Family Through Three Generations (New York, New York: Harry N Abrams, 2007).
