= Morgan Grace (politician) =

New Zealand politician and physician (1837–1903)

The Honourable Morgan Grace CMG
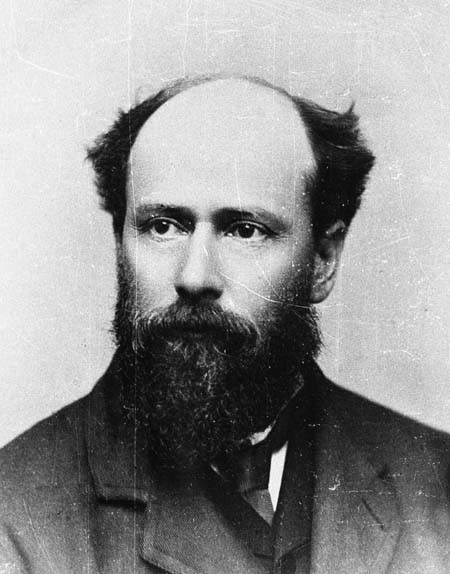

Member of the New Zealand Legislative Council
- In office 1870 – 19 April 1903

Personal details
- Born: Morgan Stanislaus Grace; 28 February 1837 Clonmel, County Tipperary, Ireland
- Died: 19 April 1903 (aged 66) Wellington, New Zealand
- Resting place: Karori Cemetery
- Spouse: Agnes Mary Johnston
- Relations: Michael P. Grace (brother); William Russell Grace (brother); Cecil Grace (nephew); John Johnston (father-in-law)
- Education: Stonyhurst College
- Occupation: Doctor, soldier, businessman, politician, churchman
- Known for: Member of the Legislative Council (New Zealand), Count of the Holy Roman Empire, author of A Sketch of the New Zealand War

Morgan Stanislaus "Stan" Grace CMG (28 February 1837 – 19 April 1903) was a surgeon in Wellington, member of the Legislative Council of New Zealand, and a staunch Roman Catholic.

== Early life ==
He was born on 28 February 1837 in Clonmel, County Tipperary, Ireland, to Ellen Mary Russell and her husband, James Grace, a landowner.

Grace grew up on a farm belonging to his father. His maternal family were Scottish Calvinists, but he was brought up and educated a Catholic. His formal education began at the Jesuit-run Stonyhurst College, England. He apparently started his university studies in Dublin and spent some time on the Continent; this may have included a period in Paris. In 1858 he received a diploma in medicine at the University of Jena, Germany, and in 1859 he took his licentiate at the Royal College of Surgeons of Edinburgh.

== Military career ==
He enlisted in the British Army on 20 April 1859 as staff assistant and surgeon. He arrived in Auckland with a detachment of troops on the Nugget on 21 June 1860, three months after the start of the Waitara war in the Taranaki Region. He served as a medical officer in the First Taranaki War, the Invasion of Waikato and in subsequent campaigns. He left the Imperial Army, joining the Colonial Forces, and became their Surgeon-General.

== Medical career ==
In 1866 Grace started a very successful medical practice in Wellington, which he was to keep up for over 30 years. He was Honorary Surgeon at the Wellington Hospital from 1879 to 1882 and Honorary Consulting Surgeon at Wellington Hospital between 1883 and 1886.

== Politics ==
In 1870 he received a letter from Sir William Fox, Premier of New Zealand, inviting him to the Legislative Council, the upper house of the New Zealand Parliament. He served on the Council until his death. In 1890 he moved the address in reply, and in a long speech looked back over his 30 years in the colony.

== Business ==
Grace was a founding director of the New Zealand board of the Australian Mutual Provident Society from 17 February 1871 and was chairman from 1891 to 1893. He was president of the New Zealand Medical Association in 1892. His many business activities included ownership of the Wellington City Tramways Company for some years. He sold the company to the Wellington City Council in 1900.

== Author ==
In 1899 Grace published a short book, A sketch of the New Zealand war.

== Family ==
On 25 January 1866 he married Agnes Mary Johnston, the daughter of John Johnston, a wealthy merchant and a member of the Legislative Council. The couple were to have nine surviving children: five boys and four girls.

His elder brother William Russell Grace was also the first Catholic Mayor of New York.

His nephew Cecil Grace attempted a crossing of the English Channel in December 1910 in an aeroplane. He flew from Dover to Calais. However, in coming back he became disoriented and over Dover flew northeast over the Goodwin Sands toward the North Sea and was lost.
