= J. Peter Grace =

American industrialist (1913–1995)

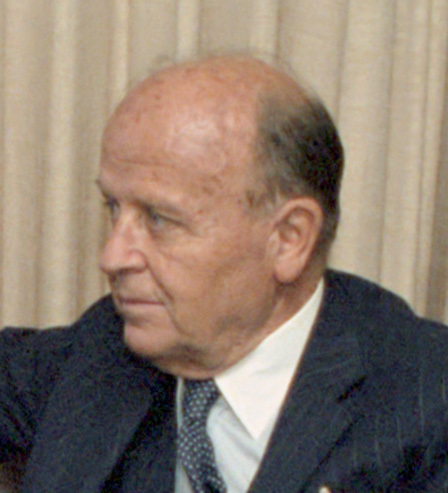
- Grace in 1982
- Born: Joseph Peter Grace Jr. May 25, 1913; Manhasset, New York, United States
- Died: April 19, 1995 (aged 81); Manhattan, New York, United States
- Education: Yale University
- Political party: Democratic
- Board member of: W. R. Grace and Company; Grace Shipping Company; Grace National Bank; Citicorp; Ingersoll-Rand; Magnavox
- Spouse: Margaret Fennelly (m. 1941)
- Children: 9
- Father: Joseph Peter Grace Sr.
- Relatives: William Russell Grace (grandfather) Michael P. Grace (great uncle) Michael P. Grace II (brother)
- Honors: Laetare Medal (1967); YMCA Dodge Medallion Award (1978); The Hundred Year Association of New York Gold Medal Award (1984)

Joseph Peter Grace Jr. (May 25, 1913 – April 19, 1995) was an American industrialist who was president of the diversified chemical company, W. R. Grace & Co., for 48 years, making him the longest serving CEO of a public company.

Born in Manhasset, New York, he succeeded his father, Joseph Peter Grace Sr. (1872–1950), as president and CEO of W. R. Grace and Company after his father suffered a stroke in 1945. The firm was founded by his grandfather William R. Grace, the first Roman Catholic to be elected Mayor of New York City. Michael Paul Grace, an earlier chairman of the board of directors of W.R. Grace & Co., was his uncle. His maternal grandfather was Charles B. Macdonald, a major figure in early American golf who built the first 18-hole course in the United States.

== Early life and career ==
Joseph Peter Grace Jr. was born May 25, 1913, in Manhasset, New York. His father was Joseph Peter Grace Sr., the former president and CEO of W.R. Grace, and his mother was Janet MacDonald. His siblings were Janet Maureen Grace, Charles MacDonald Grace, Michael P. Grace ll, and Nora Grace.

He attended St. Paul's School in Concord, New Hampshire and Yale University. In 1936, he started working in the W.R. Grace mailroom when he was at the age of 23. He became CEO and president of W.R. Grace when his father had a stroke in 1945 and subsequently retired in 1946.

== Career ==
As the president and chief executive officer of W.R. Grace, the company went through a massive diversification transformation.

- In the 1950s, W.R. Grace's Latin American operations were 60% of the company's sales volume. This was lowered to only 19% by 1962.
- The company's chemical sales growth went from 6% of sales in 1950 to 55% in 1977

The company had evolved into the fifth largest producer of chemicals in the U.S.. Adding to the diversification strategy was the acquisition of restaurants, sporting good stores, and auto parts companies.

in a 1978 interview in Columbia Journal of World Business, Grace was asked what was the greatest decision that the company had made in the last 30 years. Grace replied:

Well, I'd say buying Dewey & Almy. We paid $37 million when it was earning about $1.8 million, at about 20 times earnings. Today, its earning about $60 million.

== Authorship ==
Title	Year	Journal (if applicable) or Book Publisher	Copyright Claimant
United States Business Responds	1961	The Annals of the American Academy of Political and Social Science	American Academy of Political and Social Science (PCW)
Removing the false assumptions from economic policymaking	1981	Journal of Technology and Society	Pergamon Press
Charting a course for America’s new beginning	1981		W.R. Grace & Company
Burning Money: The Waste of Your Tax Dollars.	1984	MacMillan Publishers	The Foundation for the President's Private Sector Survey on Cost Control, Inc.
Six Virginia papers presented at the Miller Center Forums, by Theodore C. Sorenson, J. Peter Grace, Ted Greenwood ... [et al.].	1985	The Virginia Papers on the Presidency	University Press of America
Wielding the Gramm-Rudman Ax	1986	Journal of Accountancy	American Institute of Certified Public Accountants (AICPA)

== Personal life ==
J. Peter Grace was Roman Catholic. However, his mother, Janet MacDonald, was Presbyterian while his father, J. Peter Grace Sr., was Roman Catholic. He stated in a 1987 interview that he didn't understand the division between the faiths. In the same interview, he said, "It is up to the really good people to get into activities that influence lives".

He was a founding member of Legatus, an international organization of Catholic CEOs, with the shared goal to study and live in accordance with their faith as well as to spread the Christian faith in their professional and personal lives. He married Margaret Fennelly in 1941, and the couple remained together until his death. Peter and Margaret had 9 children.

== Politics ==
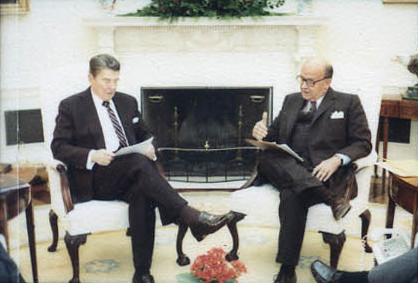
In the Oval Office in 1984

During the Kennedy administration, J. Peter Grace was head of the Commerce Department Committee on the Alliance for Progress. President Reagan, in announcing the selection of J. Peter Grace to lead the Grace Commission (Note: The Private Sector Study on Cost Control in the Federal Government is commonly referred to as the Grace Commission) for eliminating waste and inefficiency in the Federal government, said:

In selecting your Committee, we didn't care whether you were Democrats or Republicans. Starting with Peter Grace, we just wanted to get the very best people we could find, and I think we were successful.

Grace, a Democrat, was asked what he would say to the campaign theme of Walter Mondale, the 1984 Democratic presidential candidate, that higher taxes would be required to ease the deficit regardless of who wins the November election.

"I'd tell him he's nuts," Grace said. "He's wrong. He's wrong."

== Awards and memberships ==
- In 1967, he was awarded the Laetare Medal by the University of Notre Dame, the highest Catholic honor in the United States.
- In 1984, Grace received The Hundred Year Association of New York's Gold Medal Award "in recognition of outstanding contributions to the City of New York."
- In 1984, he also received the S. Roger Horchow Award for Greatest Public Service by a Private Citizen, an award given out annually by Jefferson Awards.
- The Golden Plate Award of the American Academy of Achievement.
- Grace was a leader in the American Association of the Sovereign Military Order of Malta.
- Grace was a member of the conservative American organization the Council for National Policy.
- In 1958, Grace was decorated for his efforts in the development of Latin American nations with the Order of Boyacá, in the grade of Grand Officer, by the nation of Colombia.
