= John Phipps =

John Phipps may refer to:

- John Lewis Phipps (1801–1870), British businessman and MP
- John Shaffer Phipps (1874–1958), American lawyer and businessman
- John H. H. Phipps, American heir, businessman and plantation owner
- Jack Phipps, British arts administrator
- John Thomas Phipps, American Author and Businessman
