= Grace Building =

Grace Building may refer to:

- W. R. Grace Building, New York City, United States
- Grace Building, Sydney, Australia
