= John H. H. Phipps =

American businessman and plantation owner

- Born: November 3, 1904; Massachusetts, United States
- Died: April 19, 1982 (aged 77)
- Other name: Ben Phipps
- Education: Yale University
- Occupations: Businessman, plantation owner, polo player
- Known for: Heir to family fortune and conservationist and polo player who owned radio and television station
- Spouse: Elinor Klapp Phipps
- Children: 2
- Parent(s): John Shaffer Phipps and Margarita Celia Grace
- Relatives: Michael Grace Phipps (brother), Hubert Beaumont Phipps (brother), and Margaret Phipps Boegner (sister)

John H. H. "Ben" Phipps (November 3, 1904 – April 19, 1982) was an American heir, businessman, plantation owner, conservationist and polo player. He owned radio and television stations in Florida and Georgia.

== Early life ==
His father was John Shaffer Phipps (1874–1958) and his mother Margarita Celia Grace (1876–1957). He had two brothers, Michael Grace Phipps (1910–1973) and Hubert Beaumont Phipps (1906–1969), and one sister, Margaret Phipps Boegner (1906–2006). His paternal grandfather was Henry Phipps Jr. (1839–1930) and his maternal grandfather was Michael P. Grace (1842–1920). He grew up at Old Westbury Gardens in Old Westbury, New York.

He attended Groton School, a private boarding school in Groton, Massachusetts, but he was expelled after he brought a skunk into the church. He transferred to Phillips Exeter Academy, another private boarding school in Exeter, New Hampshire. He graduated from Yale University, where he played on the polo team.

== Career ==
He purchased radio stations in the Tallahassee area in the 1940s and in Georgia in the 1950s. He also owned the WCTV television station in the area of Tallahassee and Thomasville, Georgia.

== Conservation ==
He was involved with the Phipps-Florida Foundation, the Caribbean Conservation Corporation, and the Tall Timbers Research Station and Land Conservancy. He served on the board of trustees of the New York Zoological Society from 1941 to 1980. He was also a patron of the American Museum of Natural History.

He donated his land on Alligator Point, Florida, to The Nature Conservancy for the study of birdlife. Additionally, he funded a research project to restore the sturgeon breeding grounds in the Apalachicola River and Suwannee River in Florida.

== Polo ==
He played polo at the Gulfstream Polo Club, a polo club established by his family north of Delray Beach, Florida in 1923. In 1941, together with his brother Michael Grace Phipps, Charles Skiddy von Stade and Alan L. Corey, Jr., he won the U.S. Open Polo Championship at the Meadow Brook Polo Club against the Westbury team (Gerald Dempsey, Earle Hopping, Stewart Iglehart and Windsor Holden White).

== Personal life ==
He was married to Elinor Klapp Phipps. They had two sons, Colin Phipps and Eugene Phipps. They resided in New York City. Upon his father's death, he inherited the Orchard Pond Plantation. He also developed the Ayavalla Plantation in Leon County, Florida, as a quail-hunting plantation. He died at the Tallahassee Memorial Regional Medical Center in April 1982.
