= Cecil Grace =

British aviator (1883 – disappeared 1910)

Cecil Stanley Grace
- Born: 31 December 1883; Viña del Mar, Chile
- Disappeared: 22 December 1910 (aged 26); English Channel
- Status: Declared dead in absentia; March 1911 (aged 27)
- Citizenship: British (from 1910)
- Occupation: Pilot
- Known for: Pioneer aviator
- Relatives: William Russell Grace (uncle); Michael P. Grace (uncle); Joseph Peter Grace Sr. (cousin)

Cecil Stanley Grace (31 December 1883 – disappeared 22 December 1910, declared dead March 1911) was a Chilean-born pioneer aviator who went missing on a flight across the English Channel in 1910.

== Family ==
Grace was born on 31 December 1883 in Viña del Mar, Chile to John William Grace, a banker, and Mary Josephine Grace (née Carew). Both of Grace's parents were born in Ireland and were naturalised American citizens. Grace was the paternal nephew of W. R. Grace, the former mayor of New York City and founder of W. R. Grace and Company. In October 1910, Grace became a naturalised as a British citizen.

== Eastchurch ==
In 1909 members of the Aero Club of Great Britain established a flying ground at Eastchurch on the Isle of Sheppey. Grace was one of this early group of pioneering aviators, and in April 1910 he was awarded only the fourth Royal Aero Club Aviator's Certificate.

Prior to his death, Grace had arranged to give free flying lessons to prospective pilots nominated by the Royal Navy. The lessons were subsequently given by another aviator, George Cockburn.

== Final flight ==
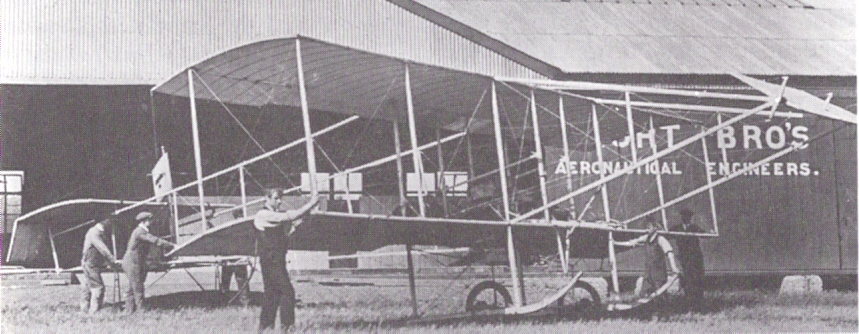
Short S.27 aircraft

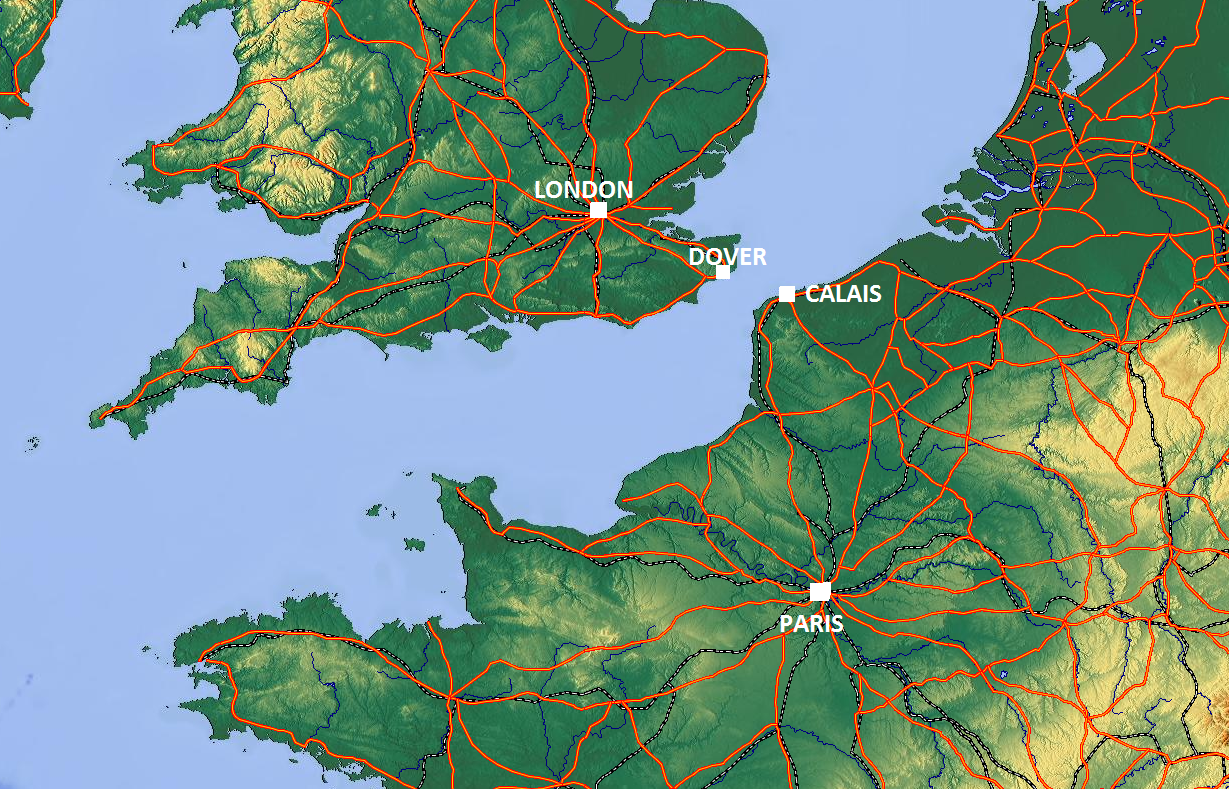
Map showing Calais in relation to London and Paris

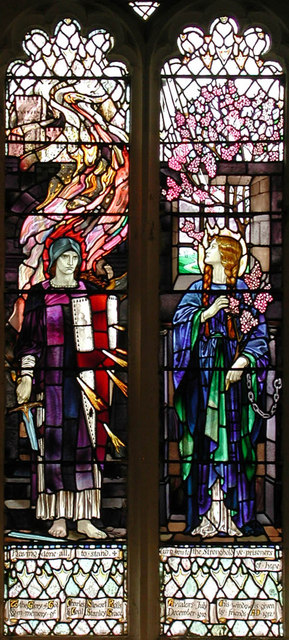
Memorial window by Karl Parsons at Eastchurch, Kent

In 1910, a number of early aviators were competing for the Baron de Forest Prize of £4,000 for the longest flight from England into continental Europe. Tom Sopwith was the first to try with a 170-mile flight into Belgium on 17 December 1910. Claude Grahame-White crashed his aircraft before he could make an attempt. Grace departed Swingate Downs on 22 December 1910 flying a Short S.27 in an attempt at the prize. The sea was covered in mist, but a telegram was received that Grace had landed due to the strong winds near the village of Les Baraques near Calais.

He eventually made it to Calais, but with strong winds he decided to return to Eastchurch via Dover and attempt a prize flight on another day. After lunch in Calais at about ten past two in the afternoon Grace left Calais to return to England. The journey to Dover was expected to last no longer than 40 minutes, but by 3:30 he had not arrived. An aeroplane had been sighted by the Coastguard from Ramsgate at about 3 o'clock about six miles out to sea near the Goodwin Sands heading north.

For a few days it was hoped that Grace had managed to land somewhere, but on 6 January 1911 a pilot's goggles and cap were washed ashore at Mariakerke (west of Ostend Belgium) were later identified as Grace's. Reportedly his aircraft wreckage was found near the same location. A body resembling Grace's was found in Ostend harbour on 14 March 1911, but it was too badly disfigured to be identifiable.

In March 1911 he was formally declared to have died. There is a stained glass window in the south wall of All Saints' Church, Eastchurch, dedicated jointly to Grace and to Charles Rolls who died the previous July. Grace's name also appeared on a monument celebrating the earliest cross-channel flights, erected at Calais by the Aero Club de France around July 1911. He was posthumously awarded the Gold Medal of the Royal Aero Club "for his achievements as a pilot and competitor".

== See also ==
- List of people who disappeared mysteriously at sea
