= Michael P. Grace =

Irish-American businessman

Michael Paul Grace
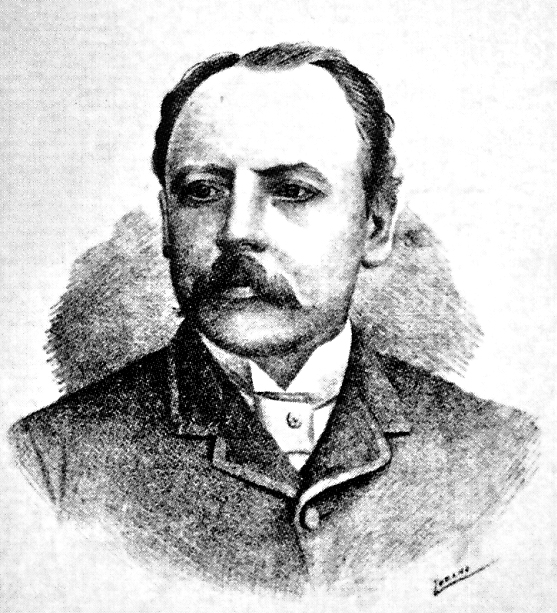
- Born: 1842; Queenstown, County Cork, Ireland
- Died: September 20, 1920 (aged 77–78); London, England
- Resting place: Battle Abbey Churchyard
- Occupation: Businessman
- Known for: Founding co-benefactor of Grace Institute
- Board member of: W. R. Grace and Company, Grace Brothers & Co., Grace National Bank
- Spouse: Margaret Mason
- Children: 4
- Relatives: William Russell Grace (brother); Morgan Stanislaus Grace (brother); Margaret Phipps Boegner (granddaughter); John H. H. Phipps (grandson); Michael Grace Phipps (grandson); Hubert Beaumont Phipps (grandson); Michael Beaumont (grandson); John Hely-Hutchinson (grandson); Cecil Grace (nephew); Joseph Peter Grace Sr. (nephew); John Shaffer Phipps (son-in-law); Hubert Beaumont (son-in-law); Richard Hely-Hutchinson (son-in-law)

Michael Paul Grace (1842 – September 20, 1920) was an Irish-American businessman who was a shareholder and chairman of the board of directors of W. R. Grace and Company shipping company of New York City and of Grace Brothers & Co. Ltd. of London, England.

Born in Queenstown, County Cork, Ireland. to a wealthy family, as a young man he went to Peru where his father had business interests and where he joined his brother William Russell Grace who had formed a partnership with John Bryce to operate as ship chandlers. William Grace would emigrate to the United States in 1865 where he established W. R. Grace & Co. of New York, while Michael Grace remained in Peru developing government contacts for the business that became Grace Brothers & Co.

Michael Grace expanded the business into new fields including a near monopoly in the business of supplying the construction contractors building Peru's railway system with rail track iron and timber for rail ties plus foodstuffs and other provisions. The Grace brothers' influence with the Peruvian government saw them obtain most of the contracts to provide munitions and battle ships during the Peru-Chile War of the Pacific between 1877 and 1884. When the war ended, Michael Grace traveled to England and in 1887 put together a consortium of lenders to provide the funding necessary to stabilize the cash-strapped government of Peru.

== The Oroya Railroad and the richest silver mine in the world ==
Michael Grace too emigrated to the United States where he would become an American citizen. The Grace brothers, along with Michael Grace's English son-in-law, Richard Hely-Hutchinson, 6th Earl of Donoughmore, widened their business in Peru to include control of the guano deposits along the Pacific coast, vast tracts of land containing both oil and mineral deposits including silver mines at Cerro de Pasco that were reported by The New York Times in its June 22, 1885 edition as "probably the richest and most extensive in the world." In conjunction with the Cerro de Pasco mines, the Grace's acquired a ninety-nine year lease, the first seven of which were free, on the financially troubled Oroya Railroad originally built in early 1870s by American promoter Henry Meiggs but not fully completed. In that same June 22, 1885 story, The New York Times concluded that "Mr. Grace [Michael P.] gets a property which cost $27,600,900—86 miles of railroad already equipped and in operation, 50 miles of the most expensive tunneling and grading in the world—for nothing provided he will complete the line."

== The New-York and Pacific Steamship Company ==
From a base in Lima, the Grace brothers set up representative offices throughout most of South America and through their Compania Salitrera obtained control over all nitrate exported by the government of Chile. Their business in Chile was such that they eventually established Grace & Co. in Valparaíso. To support the vast Grace South American operations with lower costs and in-house control, in 1892 the Grace brothers established The New-York and Pacific Steamship Company, Limited, progenitor of their Grace Steamship Company. The operation began with a fleet of six newly built steam-powered freighters that shipped products manufactured in the United States from the port at New York City around Cape Horn to various ports on the west coast of South America. The ships returned with cargos of raw materials, primarily from the Grace brothers South American businesses.

The shipping company was incorporated and headquartered in London, England, with Michael Grace as chairman of the board. He began spending a part of each year in England where between 1894 and 1915 he leased Battle Abbey as a residence for his family. He spent the other part of the year in the United States, where he maintained a home at Old Westbury on Long Island near daughter Margarita and her husband, John Shaffer Phipps, of the prominent Phipps family. In 1916, Michael Grace oversaw Grace Steamship Company's addition of a mail delivery service between New York and its regular South American ports.

== Consolidation of holdings ==
Michael and William Grace had a third brother, John W. Grace. For years, he remained mostly out of the limelight running a business in San Francisco, California. However, with Michael based in London, England for half the year plus his extensive travelling to South America, when William developed health problems in the early 1890s it made it necessary for John to come to New York to help oversee operations. As part of estate and successor planning, in 1895, the three brothers consolidated most of their holdings into a new private company incorporated in West Virginia called W. R. Grace & Company. The consolidation involved W. R. Grace & Co. of New York, Grace Brothers & Co. of Lima, Peru, Grace & Co. of Valparaíso, Chile, William R. Grace & Co. of London, and J. W. Grace & Co of San Francisco. The officers of the new company were:

- President – William R. Grace
- 1st Vice-President – Michael P. Grace
- 2nd Vice-President – John W. Grace
- Secretary & Director – Edward Eyre
- Director – Lillius Grace (Mrs. W. R.)
- Treasurer – J. Louis Schaefer

J. Louis Schaefer, who joined the company as a boy, would play a key role in not only W. R. Grace & Company in which he became a vice-president, but also as president of Grace National Bank. Schaefer would be a co-executor of the Estate of Michael Grace with William's son and corporate successor, Joseph P. Grace. J. Louis Schaefer died in 1927.

William Grace died in March 1904 in New York and brother John in September of that same year in London, England. Michael Grace then assumed control of all their companies. Because he had four daughters but no sons, Michael took William's most capable son, Joseph, under his wing and would eventually transfer his interest in the Grace businesses to him.

== Family ==
Michael Grace married Margarita Mason (1848-1930) The couple had four daughters: Elisa, Elena, Margarita, and Gladys.

Tragedy struck the family on August 10, 1917 when daughter Elisa drowned while swimming in a lake in Italy. Elisa married the Hon. Hubert Beaumont, a former Member of the British Parliament for Eastbourne.

Elisa and Hubert Beaumont had one child, Michael Beaumont. She was working as a volunteer for the Red Cross during World War I at the time of her death.

Elena married Richard Hely-Hutchinson, 6th Earl of Donoughmore in 1901.

Margarita married American businessman John Shaffer Phipps in 1903.

His niece Olive Grace Kerr married British aristocrat Charles Greville, 3rd Baron Greville in 1909.

While on an annual business trip to London, England in the late summer of 1920, the then seventy-eight-year-old Michael Grace died. He, and his wife Margarita, are buried in the churchyard in Battle Abbey.
