= Joseph Peter Grace Sr. =

American businessman and polo player

Joseph P. Grace Sr.
- Born: June 9, 1872; Great Neck, New York, U.S.
- Died: July 15, 1950 (aged 78); Great Neck, New York, U.S.
- Education: Columbia University
- Occupations: Businessman, philanthropist
- Political party: Republican
- Board member of: W. R. Grace and Company, Grace Shipping Company, Grace National Bank
- Spouse: Janet MacDonald (m. 1908; died 1937)
- Children: 3, including Peter and Michael
- Parent(s): William Russell Grace & Lillius Gilchrist

Joseph Peter Grace Sr. (June 9, 1872 – July 15, 1950) was an American businessman, polo player, and owner of Thoroughbred horses in the sport of steeplechase racing. He was the president of W.R. Grace and Company from 1907-1946.

== Early life and career ==
Grace was born on June 9, 1872, in Great Neck, New York. He was the son of businessman and two time mayor of New York City, William Russell Grace.

Grace graduated from Columbia University.

A polo player, in 1911 Grace purchased a 198-acre (0.80 km^{2}) estate in the Lakeville district of Long Island from Almeric H. Paget, son-in-law of William Collins Whitney. He would acquire a stable of polo ponies as well as thoroughbreds used in point to point steeplechase events.

A devout Roman Catholic, Joseph Grace was a member of the international organization the Sovereign Military Order of Malta, a Catholic organization that aids the sick and poor through the establishment of hospitals and clinics around the world. He also served as president of Grace Institute, a charity created in 1897 by his father and his uncle, Michael Grace, that provided tuition-free education and training in business and administrative skills to economically disadvantaged women.

== Career ==
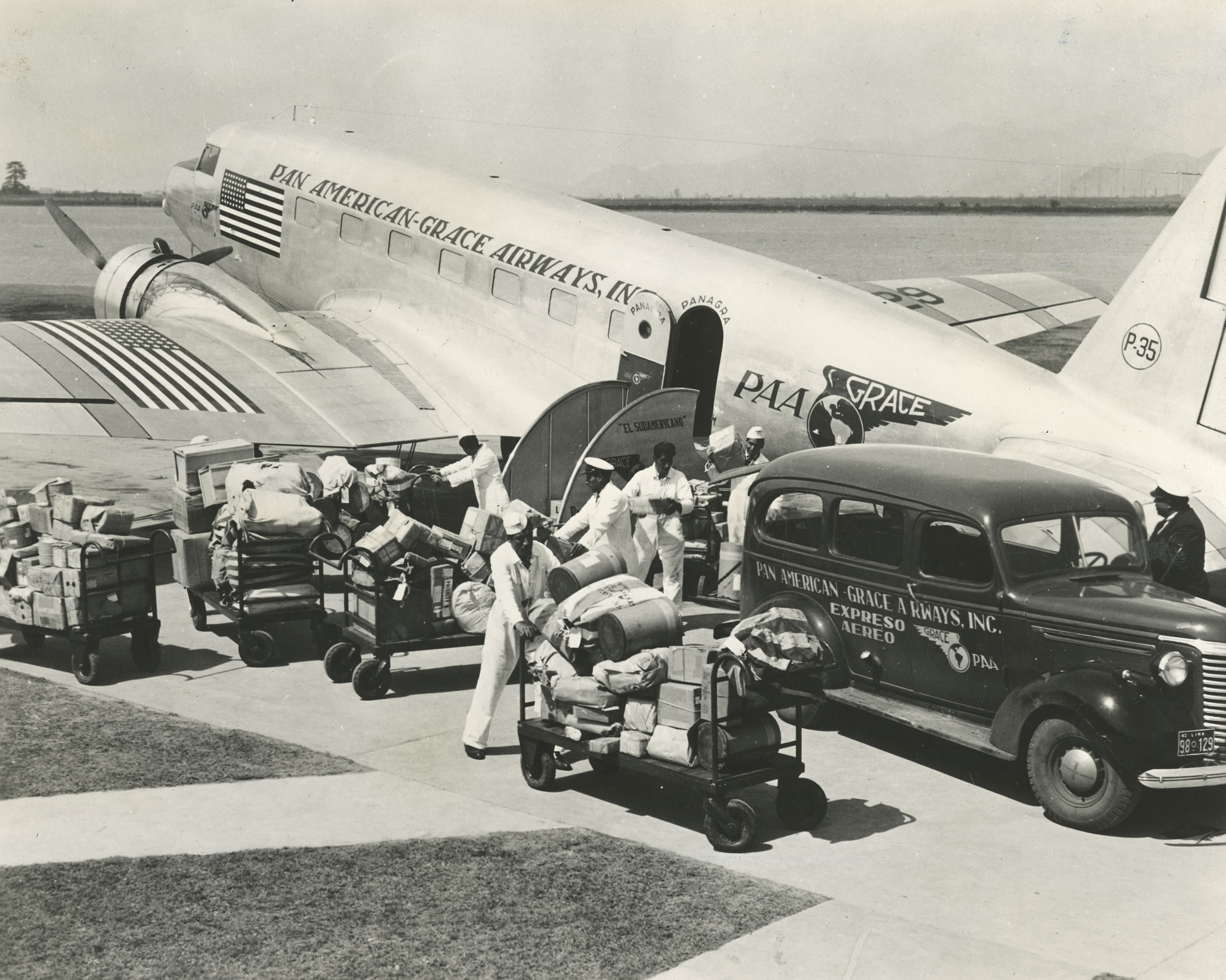
A Pan American-Grace Airways Douglas DC-2 (circa late 1930s-early 1940s), from the W.R. Grace & Co. and Pan-American World Airways partnership.

On the death of his father, William R. Grace in 1904, Edward Eyre, the company secretary and a director, was appointed president of W. R. Grace and Company. In 1907, Eyre was made company chairman and Joseph Grace became president. In 1929, Joseph Grace took over as chairman when Edward Eyre retired and Joseph's friend from his college days, D. Stewart Iglehart, was appointed president.

The W. R. Grace company's business centered on operations in Peru and surrounding South American countries. To enhance that, in 1914 Grace established Grace National Bank, a New York City private bank that concentrated on business done in South America. The extent of the W.R. Grace company's trade was such that its founders had formed Grace Shipping Company. In 1929, Joseph Grace concluded a partnership with Pan American World Airways to establish Pan American-Grace Airways, the first air carrier to serve the West Coast of South America.

In 1945, Grace suffered a debilitating stroke and in 1946 both he and D. Stewart Iglehart retired. His son, Joseph Peter Grace Jr., took over management of the company.

== Personal life ==
In 1908, he married Janet MacDonald, the daughter of Charles B. Macdonald, a major figure in early American golf who built the first 18-hole course in the United States. Together, they were the parents of five children:

- Nora Grace (1910–1935)
- Joseph Peter Grace Jr. (1913–1995), who married Margaret Fennelly in 1941 and became the longest serving CEO of a public company as CEO of W.R. Grace.
- Michael Paul Grace II (1917-1995)
- Janet Maureen Grace (1925-2006)
- Charles MacDonald Grace (1926-2013)

His wife died on December 31, 1937, at age fifty-three. Joseph Grace died of a stroke at his home in Great Neck, New York on July 15, 1950.
