= John Shaffer Phipps =

American lawyer and businessman

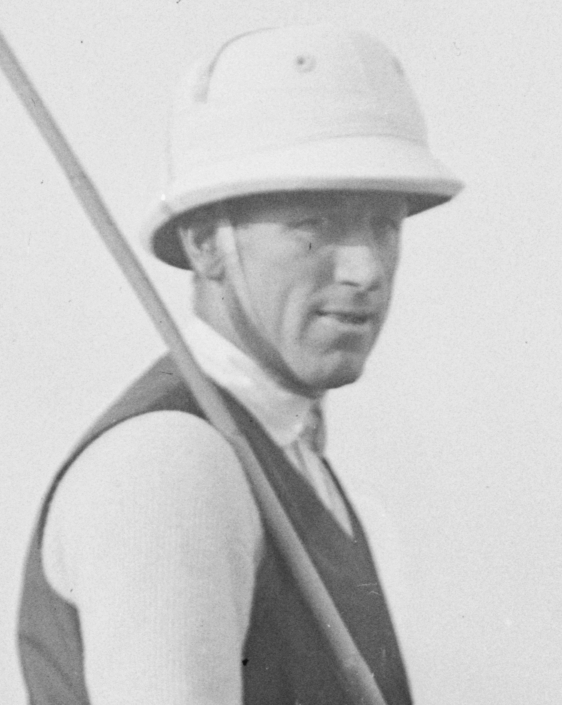
- Phipps circa 1915
- Born: August 11, 1874; Allegheny, Pennsylvania, United States
- Died: April 27, 1958 (aged 83); Palm Beach, Florida, United States
- Education: Yale University
- Occupations: Financier, lawyer, polo player, real estate developer
- Board member of: Hanover Bank, U.S. Steel Corp., W. R. Grace & Co.
- Spouse: Margarita Celia Grace (m. 1903; died 1957)
- Children: John H. H. Phipps; Michael Grace Phipps; Hubert Beaumont Phipps; Margaret Phipps Boegner
- Parent(s): Henry Phipps; Anne Childs Shaffer

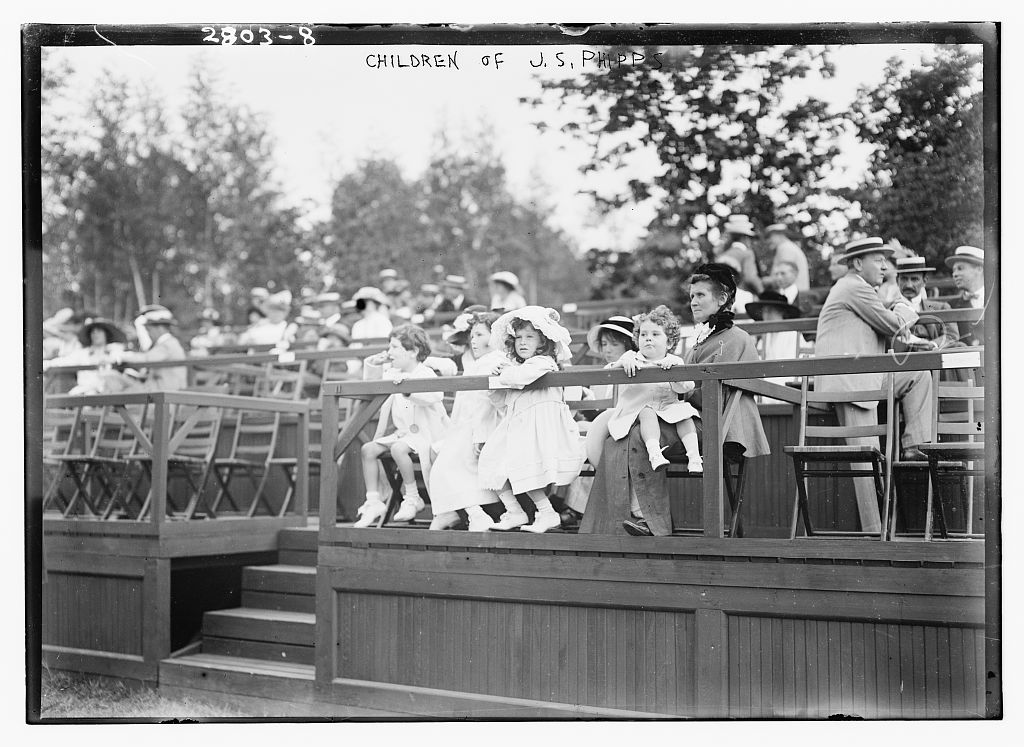
Children of John Shaffer Phipps

John Shaffer Phipps (August 11, 1874 – April 27, 1958) was an American lawyer and businessman who was an heir to the Phipps family fortune and a shareholder of his father-in-law's Grace Shipping Lines. He was a director of the Hanover Bank, U.S. Steel Corp. and W. R. Grace & Co.

== Early life ==
John Shaffer Phipps, who was known as "Jay", was born on August 11, 1874, in Allegheny, Pennsylvania, to Henry Phipps Jr. (1839–1930) and Anne Childs Shaffer (1850–1934).

His father was the son of English born parents who emigrated to Philadelphia in the early part of the 19th century before settling in Pittsburgh in 1845. His father became an entrepreneur known for his business relationship with Andrew Carnegie and involvement with the Carnegie Steel Company.

His siblings were Amy Phipps (1872–1959), who married Frederick Edward Guest (1875–1937), Helen Margaret Phipps (1876–1934), who married Bradley Martin, Henry Carnegie Phipps (1879–1953), who married Gladys Livingston Mills (1883–1970), and Howard Phipps (1881–1981), who married Harriet Dyer Price.

== Estates ==
John Phipps amassed almost 2,500 acres (10 km^{2}) of rolling Virginia farm lands in The Plains, Virginia, including Brenton, an 1889 stone manor house. He was a polo player and Thoroughbred racehorse owner, and the property assembled from 1928 onwards would be the site of his Rockburn Stud farm. Upon his death it passed to his son Hubert.

Phipps purchased an old 160-acre (0.65 km^{2}) Quaker farm on Long Island where he built a large mansion with magnificent gardens that, following his death, became a non-profit organization that today is known as Old Westbury Gardens and is open to the public.

In the 1920s he purchased several large properties in West Palm Beach, Florida, including one that was once used as a pineapple plantation. He subdivided the property and turned it into the three largest subdivisions containing luxury residential homes in what is now the El Cid Historic District. John Phipps built a home for himself he called "Casa Bendita." A large oceanfront mansion in Palm Beach, Florida, it was designed in 1921 by architect Addison Mizner. Today, the property is occupied by his granddaughter, Susan Phipps Cochran, and her husband.

== Personal life ==
On November 4, 1903, he married Margarita Celia Grace (1876-1957) at Battle Abbey in Battle, East Sussex, England. She was the daughter of Michael P. Grace and niece of William Russell Grace, Irish immigrants who became very successful in business, founding the Grace Shipping Line. They spent their honeymoon, traveling via automobile, in India. John and Margarita had four children:

- John H. H. Phipps (1904–1982), who married Elinor Klapp
- Hubert Beaumont Phipps (1905–1969), who married Lady Phoebe Pleydell-Bouverie, third daughter of William Pleydell-Bouverie, 7th Earl of Radnor.
- Margaret Phipps Boegner (1906–2006), who married J. Gordon Douglas, Jr.
- Michael Grace Phipps (1910–1973), who married Muriel Fillans "Molly" Lane (1909–1968).

He died on April 27, 1958, in Palm Beach, Florida.

== See also ==
- Phipps family
- Old Westbury Gardens
