= John Johnston (New Zealand politician) =

New Zealand politician and businessman

The Honourable John Johnston
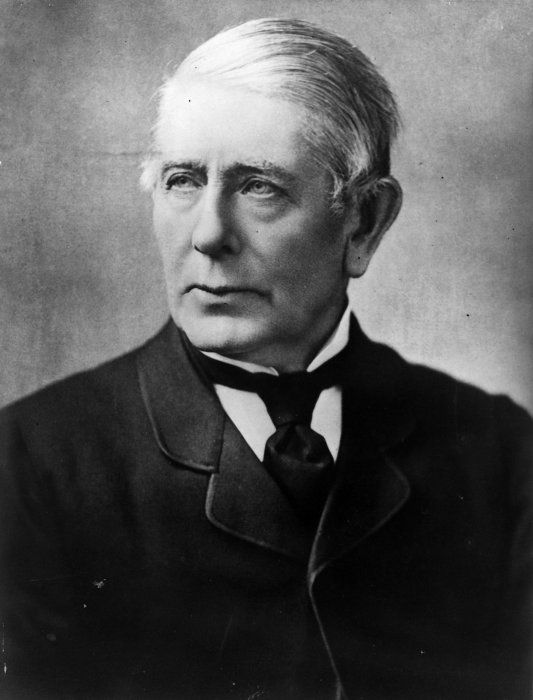
- Johnston, c. 1869

Member of the New Zealand Legislative Council
- In office 31 March 1857 – 6 November 1860
- In office 11 March 1861 – 16 November 1887

Personal details
- Born: Robert Johnstone; 23 July 1809 Kirkoswald, South Ayrshire, Scotland
- Died: 16 November 1887 (aged 78) Wellington, New Zealand
- Spouse: Henrietta Charlotte Hatton (m. 1838; died 1878)
- Relations: Walter Johnston (son); Charles Johnston (son); Morgan Grace (son-in-law); Westby Perceval (son-in-law)
- Children: 6

John Johnston (23 July 1809 – 16 November 1887) was a Scottish-born New Zealand politician and businessman. He was a prominent Member of the New Zealand Legislative Council and the founder of the stock and station agency mercantile house known as Johnston & Co.

== Biography ==
Johnston, whose name was also spelt Johnstone, was born in Ayrshire south-west Scotland in 1809, the son of Robert Johnstone, of the Ayrshire branch of Clan Johnstone of Annandale, and his wife Mary (née Woods). In 1838, he married Henrietta Charlotte Hatton, who was a devout Roman Catholic. He arrived with his family in Wellington from London via Nelson on 3 January 1843 on the Prince of Wales. He travelled with his wife, their two sons Walter Woods and Sydney and their daughter Agnes Mary who was born during the journey. He was of Presbyterian background, but his children were brought up in their mother's Catholic faith.

In the early 1840s, he founded the large mercantile house and stock and station agency known as Johnston and Co. and continued to take an active part until 1878, when he retired from business, leaving the company in the hands of his sons: the Hon. Walter Johnston who, like his father, was an ex-Minister, and the Hon. Sir Charles Johnston, M.L.C. Johnston also held land in Wellington and the lower North Island where he built the house at Oruawharo for Sydney, his second son who took charge of these holdings (Percival Sydney Johnston 1841–1917). His residence was in Fitzherbert Terrace Thorndon.

Johnston was a member of the Wellington Provincial Council between December 1855 and April 1872. He first represented the Wellington Country electorate, and since 1865 he was a member for Karori and Mākara. At various times (1858, 1861–1862, 1868), he was a member of the Wellington Executive Council. Johnston was appointed to the Legislative Council on 31 March 1857 and served until 6 November 1860, when his membership lapsed through absence. He was reappointed on 11 March 1861 and remained a member for the rest of his life. Johnston was prominent as a legislator for many years. Johnston was a member of the Executive Council in the Stafford Ministry, from 14 May 1866 until 5 April 1867.

His eldest daughter, Agnes Mary, married Morgan Stanislaus Grace on 25 January 1866 at Wellington. His third daughter, Jessie Mary, married Westby Perceval on 11 May 1880 at Wellington.

Henrietta Johnston died on 23 February 1878. He died on 16 November 1887 at Wellington, aged 76 years, and was buried three days later. At his death, his property was estimated to be worth £1,000,000.
