= Herman's World of Sporting Goods =

American sporting goods retailer

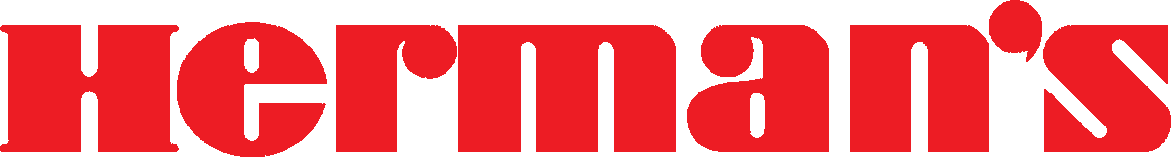
- Type: Defunct
- Industry: Retail
- Founded: 1916
- Defunct: 1996
- Fate: Liquidation
- Headquarters: Carteret, New Jersey
- Products: Sporting goods

Herman’s World of Sporting Goods was a sporting goods retailer in the United States. Founded in 1916 by Herman and Eddie Steinlauf as a music store in Nassau Street, Lower Manhattan, the company expanded into sporting goods and grew to multiple locations in the New York metropolitan area, including East 42nd Street, East 34th Street, and Paramus, New Jersey.

== History ==
In 1970, Herman's was sold to W. R. Grace and Company as a four-store chain. Leonard Steinlauf, who had expanded to a fourth store in Paramus, resisted the sale, preferring to develop a national chain of sporting goods superstores. Despite his objections, he sold his 25% share and later became CEO, but his tenure lasted less than ten years due to strained relations with W.R. Grace.

In 1985, Dee Corporation acquired Herman's and expanded westward by purchasing M&H Sporting Goods in 1986. By 1992, Herman's operated 259 stores in 35 states.

The company was sold to the Taggert/Fasola Group in 1993, which filed for Chapter 11 bankruptcy due to excessive debt from acquisitions. The company closed stores outside of the Northeast, though it retained profitable locations. Herman's emerged from Chapter 11 in September 1994 with 103 units in the Northeast Corridor.

Despite efforts to revitalize, Herman's faced financial difficulties and filed for Chapter 11 again on April 26, 1996. The company eventually liquidated its stores, with regional competitor Modell's Sporting Goods acquiring 16 locations.

Herman's main executive offices and warehouse were located in Carteret, New Jersey.
