= Grace Institute =

- Founder: William Russell Grace
- Established: 1897
- Mission: To provide tuition-free education and training in administrative skills to economically disadvantaged women.
- Location: 40 Rector Street, New York City, New York, United States
- Website: GraceInstitute.org

The nonprofit Grace Institute provides education and training in business and administrative skills to economically disadvantaged women.

== Founding ==
In 1897, William R. Grace, twice Mayor of New York City, and his brother, Michael P. Grace, with the help and support of William’s wife, Lillius, established Grace Institute as a tuition-free nonsectarian educational and vocational school for immigrant women. They purchased the old Moore mansion on Tenth Avenue and West 60th Street to house the school that was incorporated by the New York State Legislature on April 16, 1897. Grace Institute was endowed as a memorial to William’s and Michael’s parents, James and Ellen Grace of Ireland.

An Irish immigrant who achieved the American dream, William Russell Grace was a success in business. He founded the W. R. Grace and Company, and was twice Mayor of the City of New York. He knew what it took to make a home and a life in a new country. He was determined to provide new arrivals with the opportunity not only to succeed in America, but to also contribute to the growth and prosperity of their adopted country.

The Grace family chose to open the Grace Institute to meet the training needs of immigrant women arriving in New York by the hundreds of thousands in the late 1800s. Many women arrived as young wives with families, needing to learn how to care for a home and family in their new country. Still others arrived alone without the skills to earn a living.

The Sisters of Charity of New York were asked to administer and staff the school. Sister Marie Dolores Van Rensselaer, who had opened Seton Hospital three years earlier, was appointed first superior of Grace Institute. Three hundred women were enrolled when Grace Institute first opened its doors in 1898. The following winter enrollment grew to 500 students. From 1900 to 1962, over 900 students each year attended classes at the West Side mansion.

== The early years ==
The school was staffed and run for many years by the Sisters of Charity, a Catholic order of nuns. The curriculum guide in 1898 listed cookery, millinery, childcare, Red Cross, children’s sewing, and dressmaking as course offerings. Classes in the daytime were organized for housewives and included an informal day nursery. Evening classes were scheduled for working women.

By the turn of the century, Grace Institute was offering a schedule of business classes in typing, bookkeeping, and stenography to help women secure jobs in New York City’s rapidly growing business community. This training qualified women for the better paying positions in offices that were a welcome alternative to factory work. In 1902 the school had 1002 students with 497 in Dressmaking, 272 in Stenography and Type- writing, and 233 in Cooking.

Over the years, the school evolved into a secretarial school that prepared young women for careers in the business world. From 1898 to 1962, over 70,000 women received training.

== New Location ==
In the early 1960s part of Fordham University was to be located in the new Lincoln Center complex, necessitating that the Trustees of the Institute find another facility to house the school. Under the leadership of Grace Institute President J. Peter Grace, grandson of William Russell Grace and chairman and chief executive officer of W. R. Grace & Co., the Institute chose to construct a new school on Second Avenue between 64th and 65th Streets. The new 14-story construction included three floors for the school.

In 2015 Grace Institute purchased a floor in 40 Rector Street, on the 14th floor, and renovated it from scratch. Using the latest technology, Grace continues to offer classes in Administrative Professional (includes internships) and Patient Services Representatives: where they cover the full range of computer competencies, including Microsoft Word, Excel, PowerPoint and Outlook; social media; cloud computing and automation; plus typing for speed and accuracy.

Continuing as a tuition-free, nonsectarian school, Grace Institute programs attracted women of all ages and from all walks of life who lived in the greater New York metropolitan area.

== Today ==
A day hybrid program is offered in business skills emphasizing computers, keyboarding, business writing, and more. Students learn personal skills such as interviewing and resume-writing techniques. All women must have a high school diploma or GED, be fluent in English, and be eligible to work in the United States. Grace Students come from diverse racial, ethnic, and religious backgrounds and range in age from late 18 to 64. Since 1897, over 100,000 women have graduated from Grace.
