= Michael Grace Phipps =

American businessman, polo player, and horse breeder

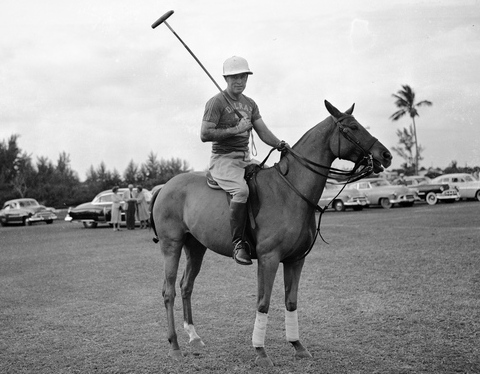
- Phipps, pictured at the Gulfstream Polo Club in 1940
- Born: January 10, 1910; United States
- Died: March 13, 1973 (aged 63); Palm Beach, Florida, US
- Education: St. Bernard's School, St. Paul's School, Yale University
- Board member of: Bessemer Securities Corporation, W. R. Grace and Company
- Spouse: Muriel Fillans "Molly" Lane (1909-1968)
- Children: 2
- Parent(s): John Shaffer Phipps & Margarita Celia Grace
- Relatives: Hubert Phipps (brother)
- Honors: Museum of Polo and Hall of Fame (1994); Keeneland Mark of Distinction (1981)

Michael Grace Phipps (January 10, 1910 – March 13, 1973) was an American businessman, champion polo player, owner/breeder of racehorses, and a philanthropist.

== Biography ==
Michael Phipps was the son of John Shaffer Phipps and Margarita Celia Grace, daughter of Michael P. Grace. He was a member of the Yale University intercollegiate championship polo team in both 1930 and 1932. He participated in the 1936 and 1939 International Polo Cup. A member of the Meadowbrook Polo Club on Long Island, New York, in 1938 he was elevated to a Ten Goal ranking, the highest level achievable in polo. On March 17, 1994 he was posthumously elected to the Museum of Polo and Hall of Fame.

=== Education and business career ===
Michael Phipps studied at St. Bernard's School and St. Paul's School before going on to Yale University. Phipps became a successful investor and would serve as a vice president of his family's Bessemer Securities Corporation and sit on the board of directors of W. R. Grace and Company, a company owned by his maternal grandfather's family.

=== Thoroughbred racing ===
Several members of the Phipps family were involved in horse racing. Most notably from the same era as Michael Phipps was his brother Hubert, a cousin Ogden, as well as his uncle Henry Carnegie Phipps whose wife was a partner in the renowned Wheatley Stable. On the death of his father, Michael Phipps purchased his stable of horses from the Estate. Some of the successful Thoroughbreds owned and raced by Michael Phipps were Raja Baba and Gentleman James.

Michael Phipps served on the board of directors of Hialeah Park Race Track.
