= 60 Water Street =

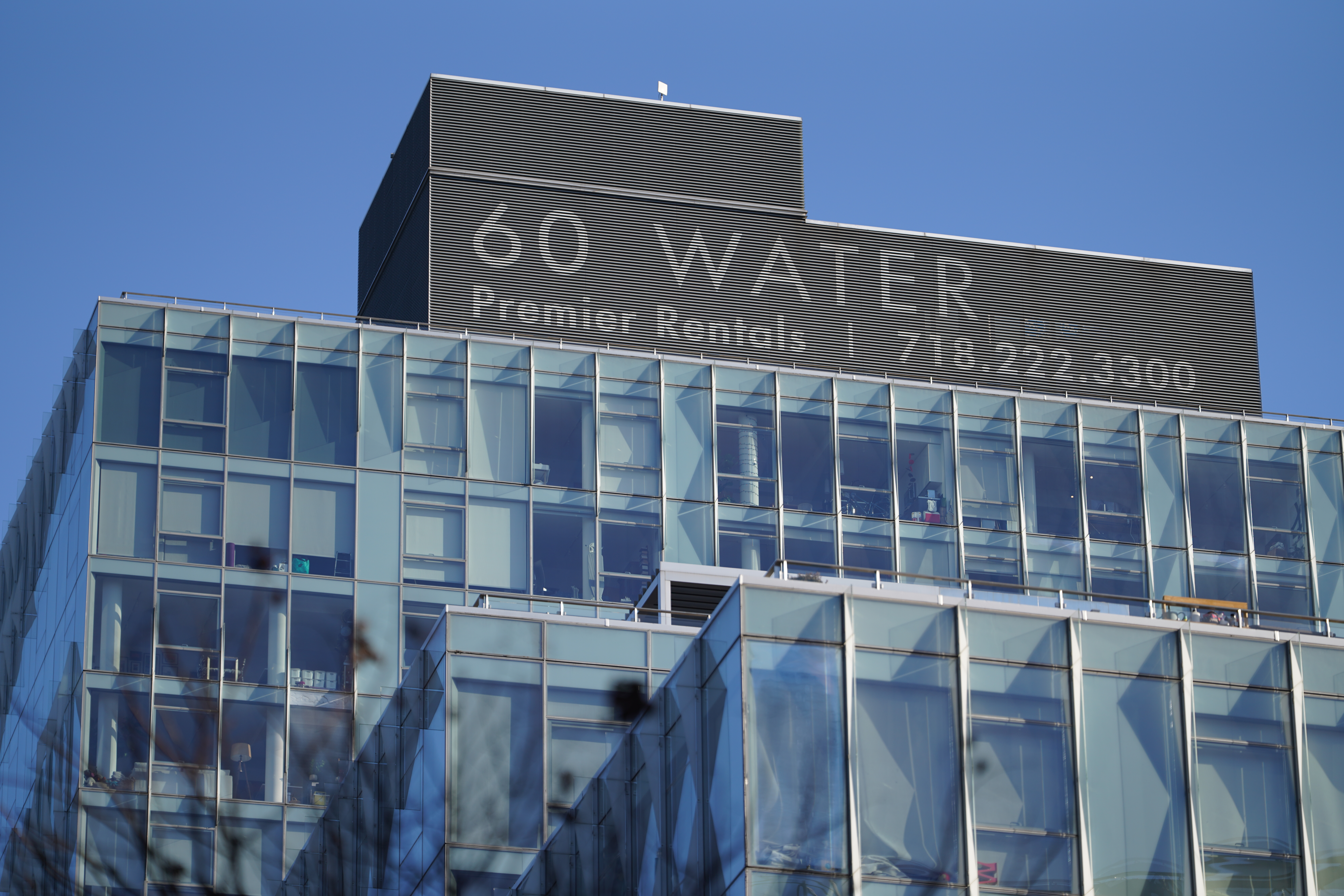
- Interactive map of the 60 Water Street area

General information
- Type: Mixed use
- Location: Brooklyn, New York, 60 Water Street, Dumbo
- Coordinates: 40.7033°N 73.9916°W
- Opened: Spring, 2015
- Cost: $150 million
- Client: Two Trees Management Co. LLC

Technical details
- Floor area: 350,000 sq ft (33,000 m^{2})

Design and construction
- Architects: Thomas Leeser, Ismael Leyva

Other information
- Parking: three levels of underground parking

Website
- 60water.com

60 Water Street is a 17-story mixed-use building in the Dumbo neighborhood of Brooklyn in New York City. Designed by Ismael Leyva and Leeser Architecture, the mixed use building is located right next to the Brooklyn Bridge and features many sustainable considerations. The building envelope design uses pattern at two scales to enliven the surface of the residential tower project. Finished in Spring 2015, the building utilizes its staggered towers to create green features including a low-intensive green roof and a garden roof deck overlooking the Brooklyn Bridge.

== Description ==
The building is composed of a three-level underground public parking garage; 10,000 square feet of ground floor retail space along Water Street; a full-floor, 45,000-square-foot public middle school to serve 300 students; and 220,000 square feet of rental apartments, 20% of which is designated for affordable housing.

== Awards ==
2014 Asia Property Award for Best Commercial Architectural Design.
