= W. R. Grace Building =

Office skyscraper in Manhattan, New York

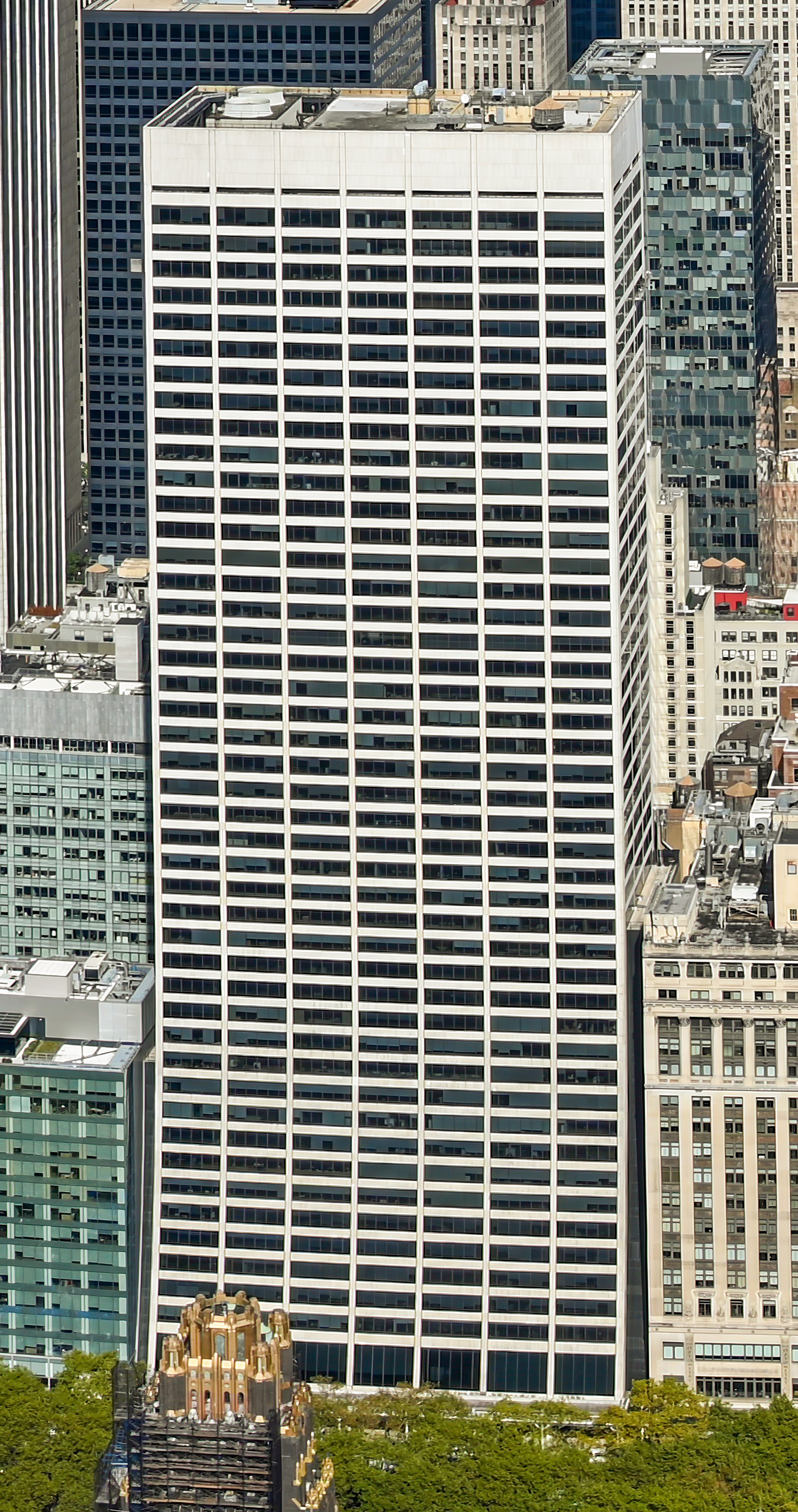
- Viewed from the Empire State Building, 2025

General information
- Type: Commercial offices
- Location: Sixth Avenue & 42nd Street; New York City, New York
- Coordinates: 40°45′17″N 73°58′57″W
- Construction started: 1970
- Completed: 1972
- Owner: Brookfield Properties

Height
- Roof: 630 ft (190 m)

Technical details
- Floor count: 50
- Floor area: 1,478,531 sq ft (137,360.0 m^{2})

Design and construction
- Architects: Gordon Bunshaft; Skidmore, Owings & Merrill

The W. R. Grace Building is a skyscraper in Manhattan, New York City. The building was designed principally by Gordon Bunshaft, and completed in 1972. The building was commissioned by the W.R. Grace Company, and was also used by the Deloitte & Touche, LLP.

The building's address is 1114 Sixth Avenue, but the main entrance is on 42nd Street, between Fifth and Sixth Avenues. It overlooks Bryant Park and the New York Public Library's main branch. The building size has approximately 1.518 million square feet (141,000 m^{2}) that are rentable, and sits on a site approximately 100 by 442 feet (30 by 135 m).

The Grace Building is located on the former site of Stern's flagship department store and headquarters. The building is currently owned by Brookfield Financial Properties, LP. Tenants include Bain & Company. The Michelin-starred restaurant Gabriel Kreuther is located in its lobby.

== Architecture ==
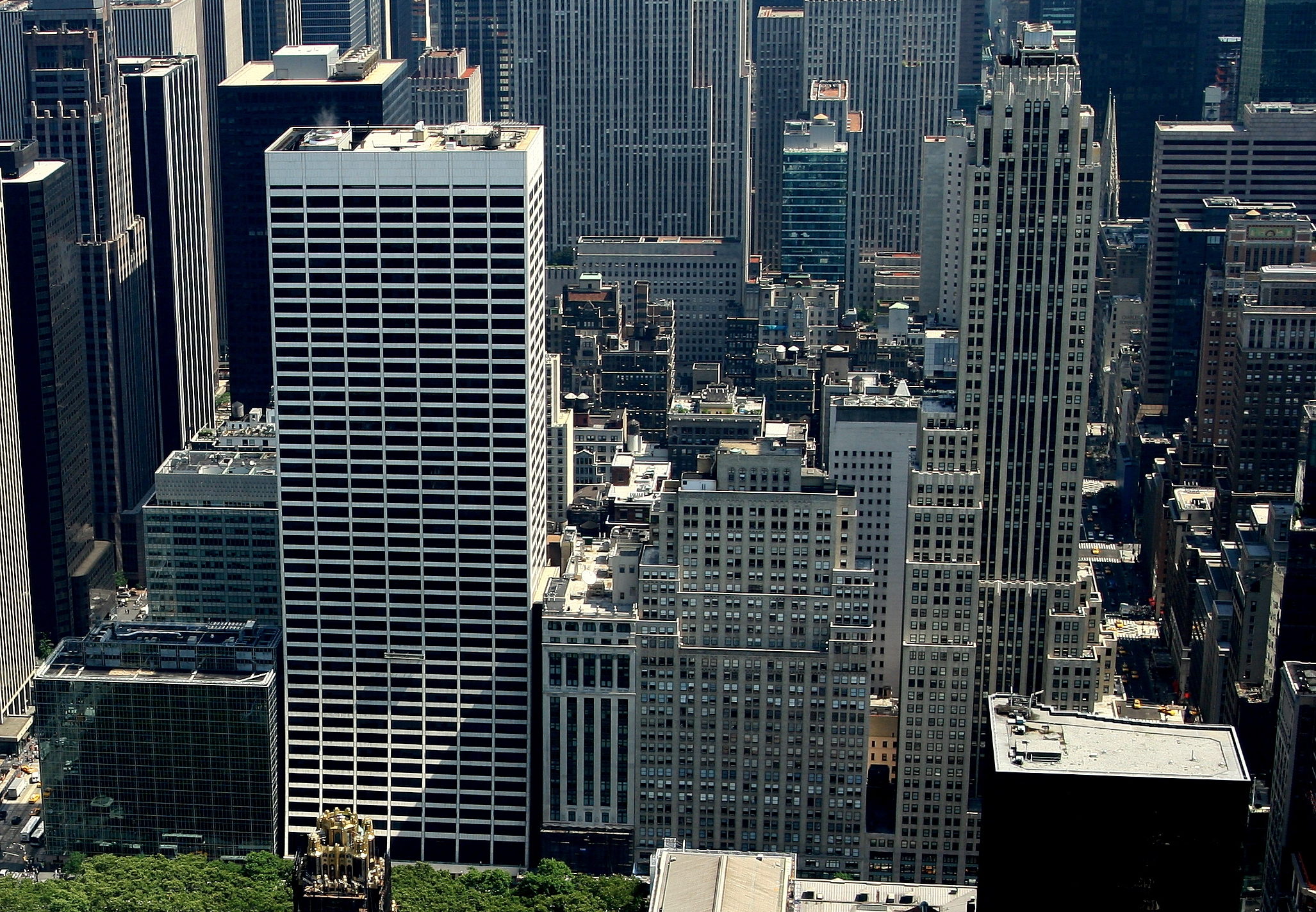
From left to right: HBO headquarters, W. R. Grace Building, Aeolian Hall (houses the State University of New York College of Optometry), Salmon Tower Building and 500 Fifth Avenue (annotated image on Wikimedia Commons)

The building was designed by Gordon Bunshaft. It has 50 floors, is 630 feet (190 m) tall, and features a parking garage beneath the building for 185 vehicles. One of the aesthetic attributes of the building is the concave vertical slope of its north and south facades, on 42nd and 43rd Street, though only the 42nd Street side has an entrance. A reception area on the 47th and 48th floors was designed by Duffy Inc.

The Grace Building uses the original, rejected design for the facade of the Solow Building, another Bunshaft creation. The sloping facade is also similar to the Chase Tower in Chicago. The exterior of the building is covered in white travertine, which forms a contrast against the black windows and makes the building appear brighter than those surrounding it. The Grace building has faced backlash regarding its design since its opening in 1974, with many criticizing its addition to the skyline and its unusual shape; some question the space taken up by the surrounding plaza. In fact, the company searched for a student design following the opening of the building to improve the design of the plaza.

W. R. Grace Building

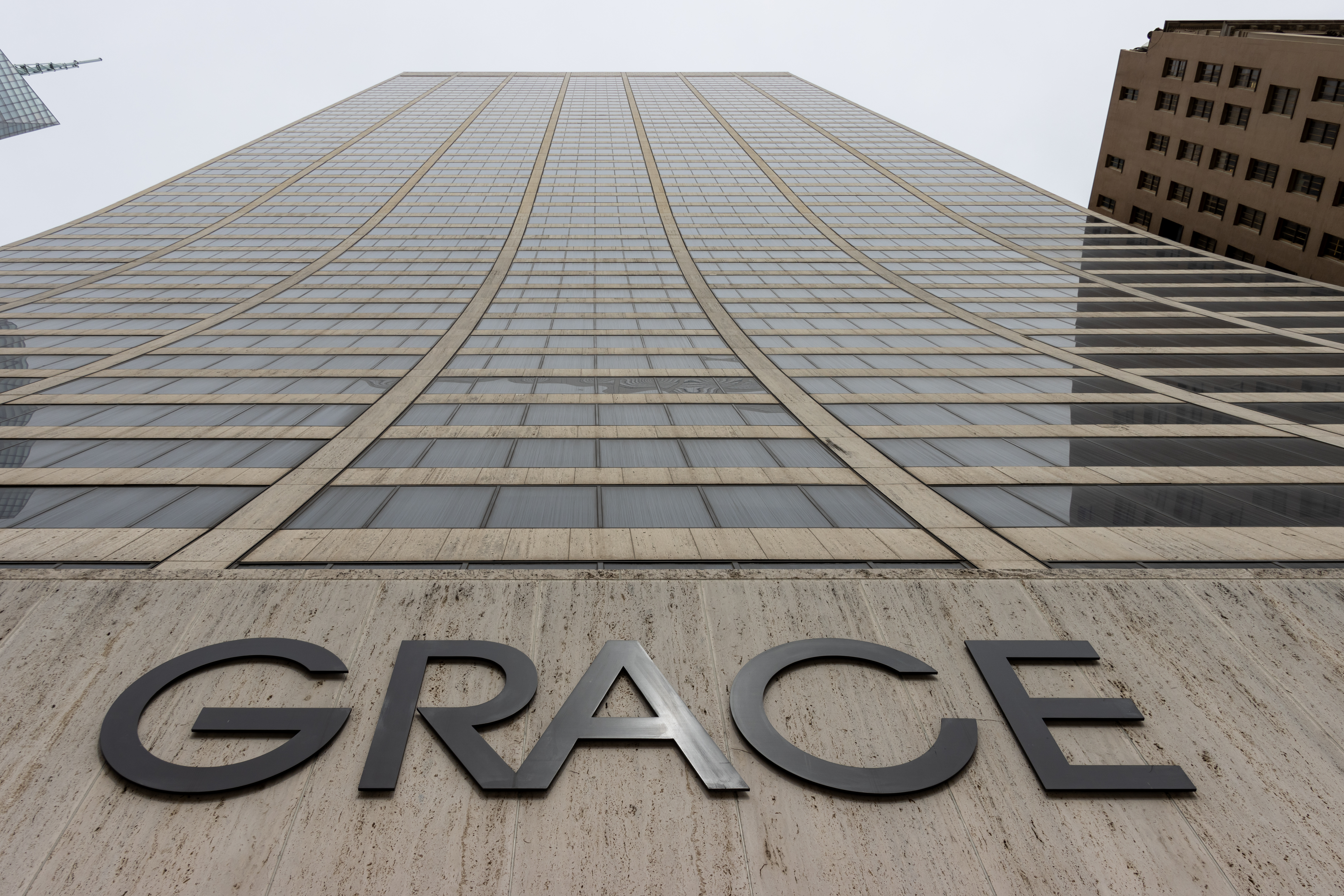
W. R. Grace Building, looking up in front of the entrance on 42nd Street

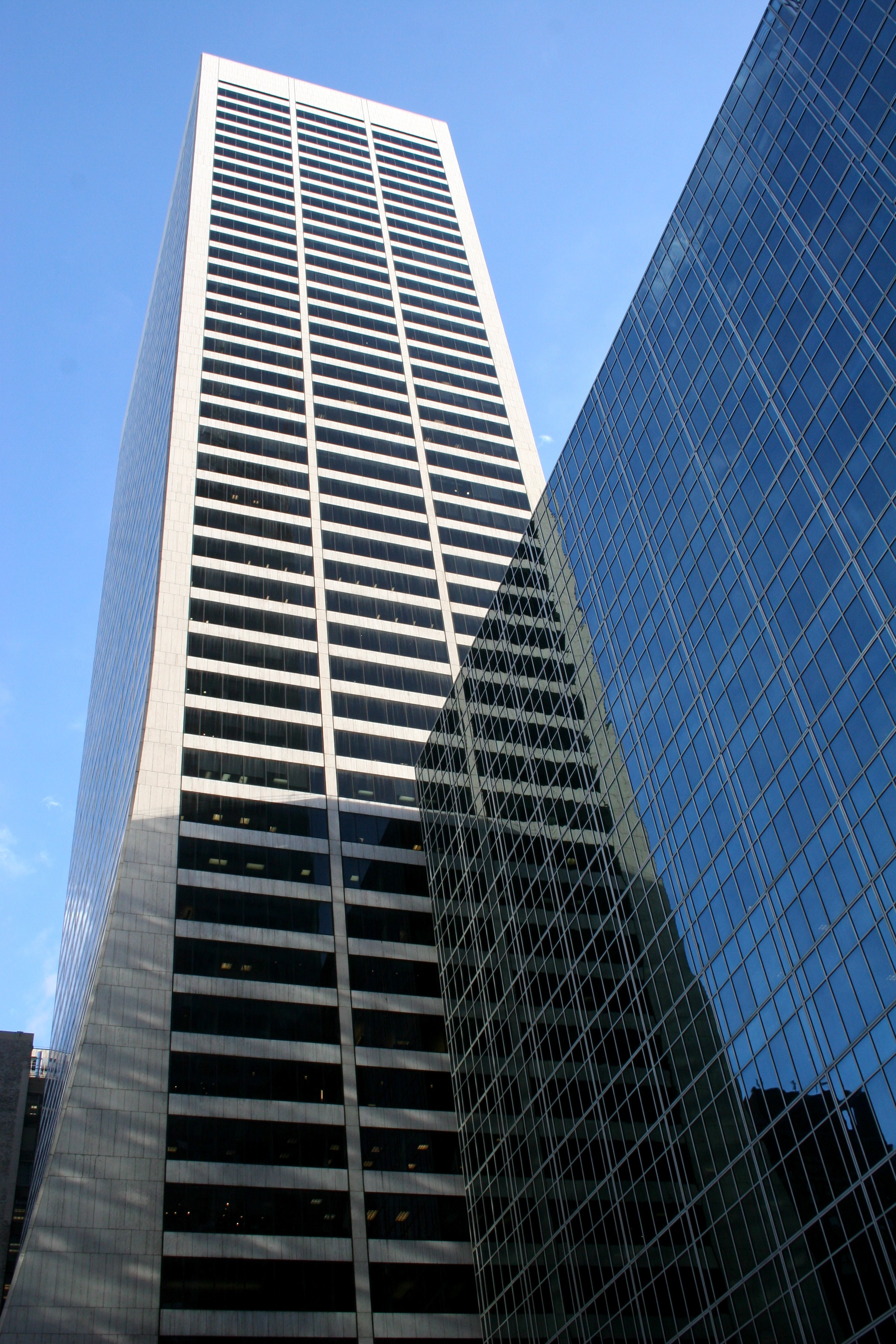
Tower against the sky

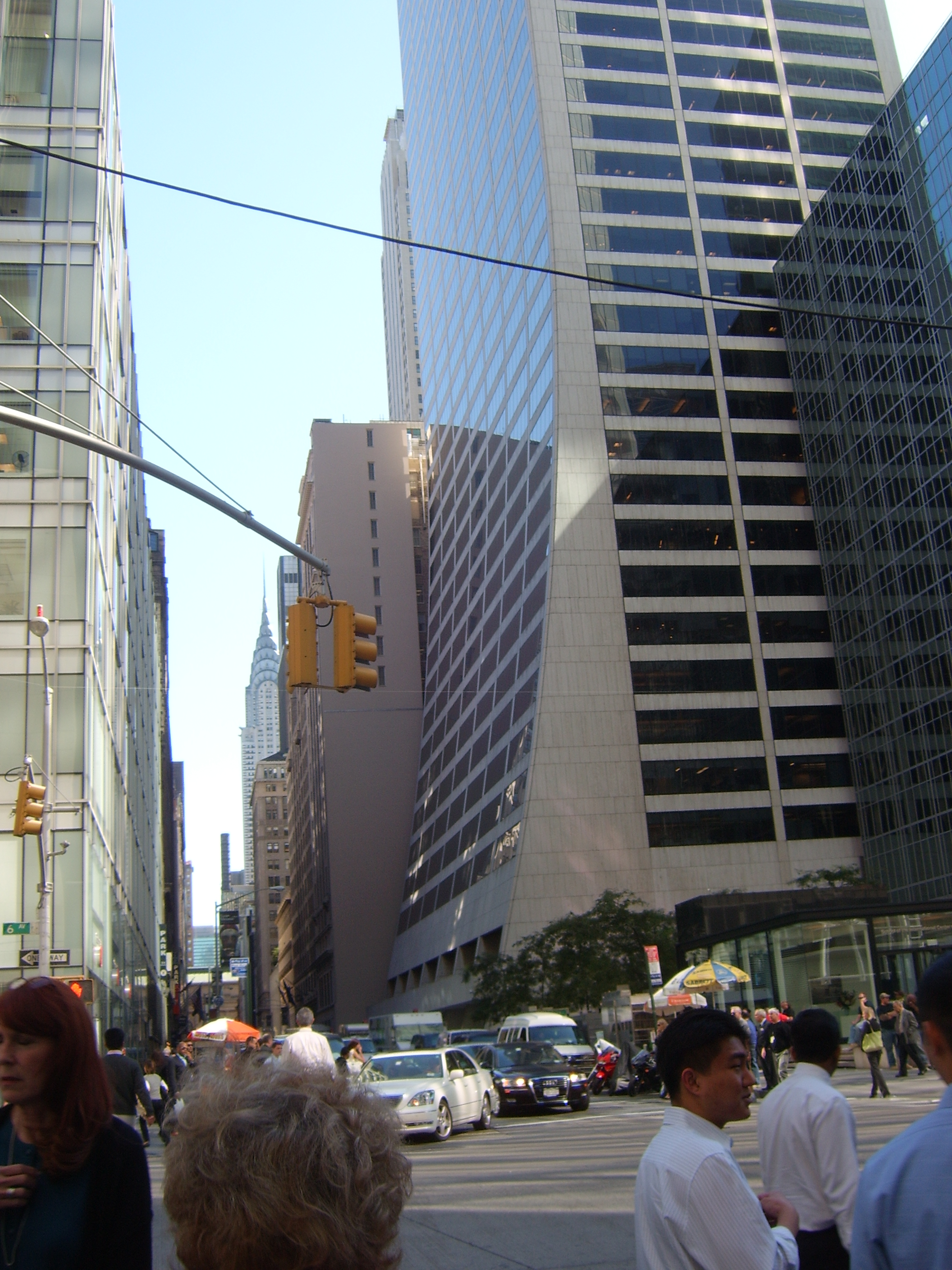
View from intersection of 43rd Street and Sixth Avenue

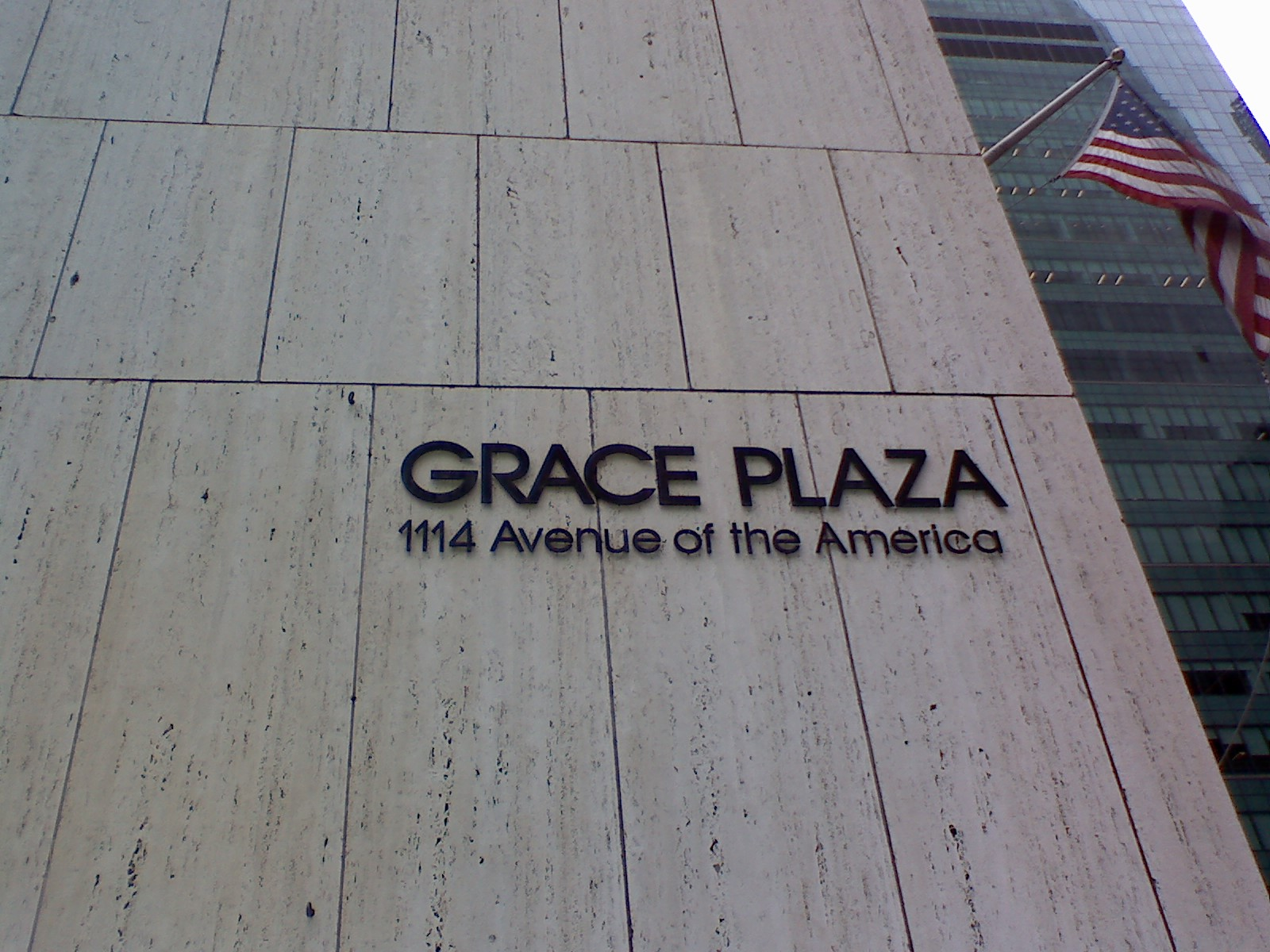
View looking up from plaza

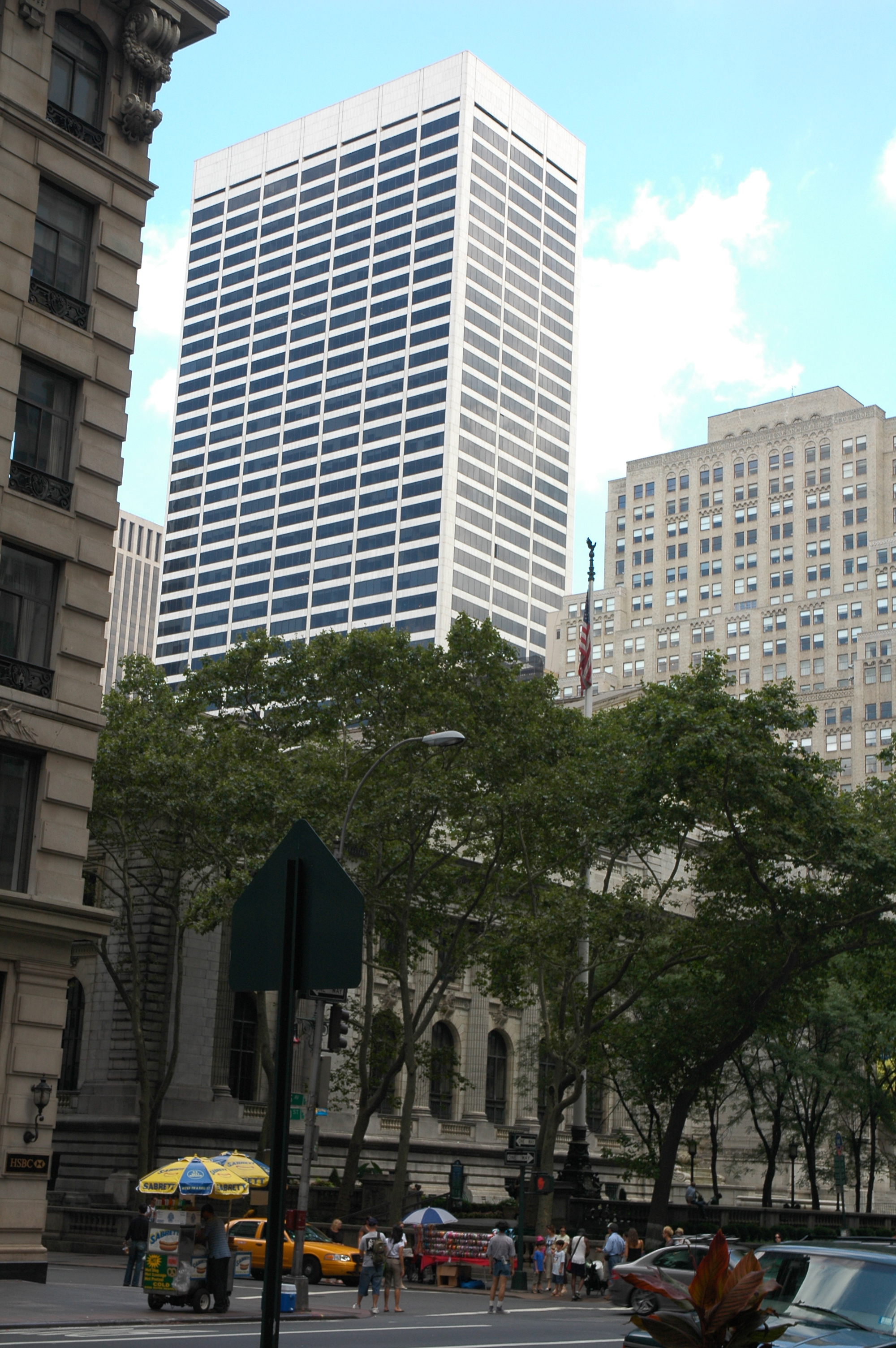
View from 40th Street and Fifth Avenue, New York Public Library in foreground

== See also ==
- List of tallest buildings in New York City
