= Grace National Bank =

Grace National Bank was a bank headquartered in New York, New York. It was established as local private bank by W. R. Grace and Company in 1914 to concentrate on business done in South America. On June 19, 1924, the Grace National Bank became a nationally chartered financial institution. The bank operated from a head office in the Grace National Bank Building at 58-60 Water Street.

The founding president was J. Louis Schaefer, a vice-president at W. R. Grace and Company. He died in 1927 and was succeeded by Francis H. McKnight (1927-1933) then Chester R. Dewey. Other former presidents included Frank Comerford Walker.

Grace National Bank lost clients and deposits during the Great Depression of the 1930s but survived and began growing again in the post World War II era. In 1950, the bank earned the largest gross and net profit in its thirty-five-year history.

In the 1960s, the bank struggled with stiff competition from large operations and on August 10, 1965, the Federal Reserve Board of Governors gave its approval for the merger of Grace National Bank with the Marine Midland Bank (now HSBC Bank USA), with a vote of 6-1 from the Federal Reserve Board. The dissenting vote was from James L. Robertson, who had stated:

I cannot accept the view that simply because Grace has in effect been labeled a limited service bank and Marine Midland a full service bank, there is no significant competition.
