= William Russell Grace =

84th and 86th mayor of New York City (1832–1904)

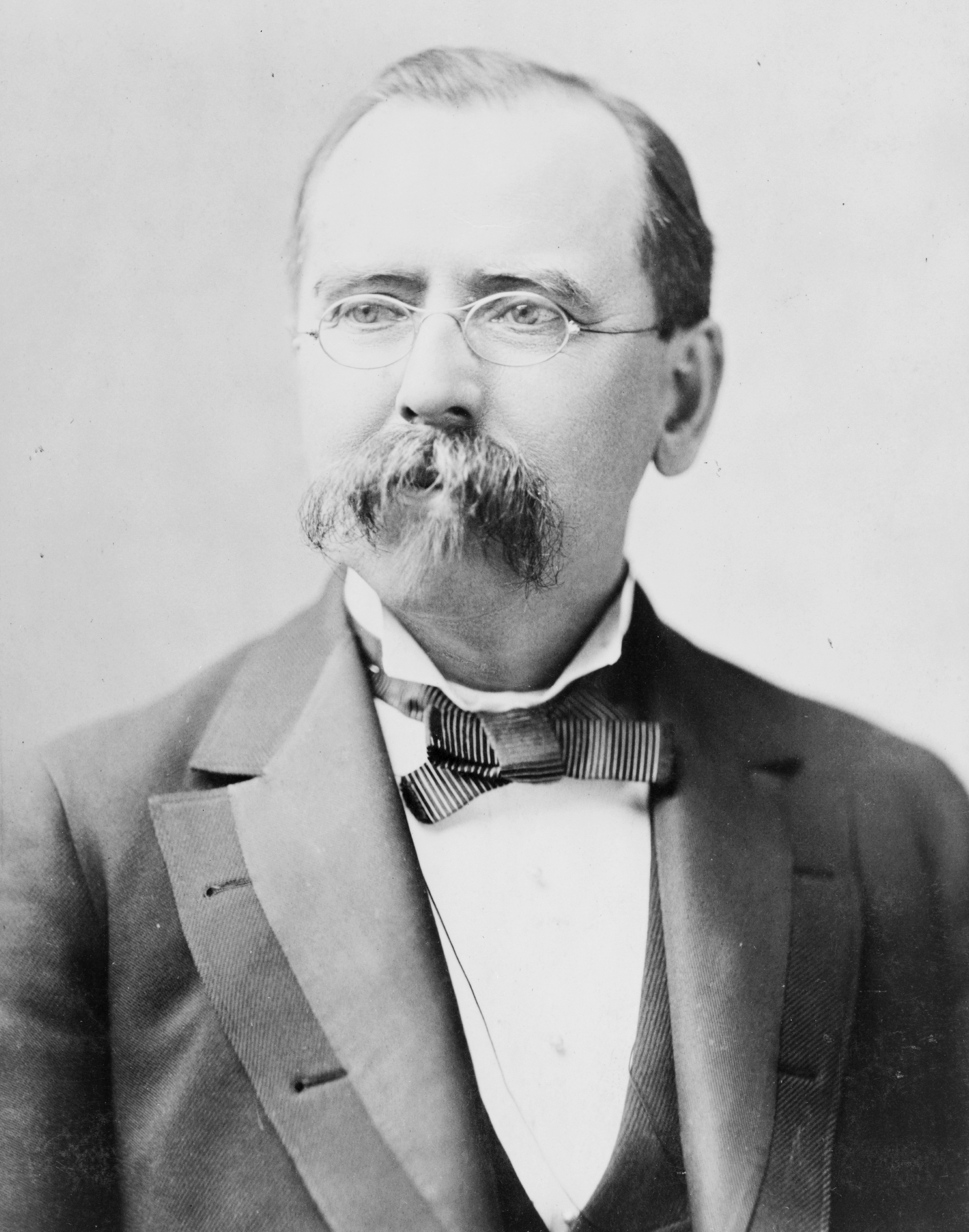
- Grace, while Mayor of New York City

87th & 85th Mayor of New York City
- In office 1885–1886
- Preceded by: Franklin Edson
- Succeeded by: Abram Hewitt
- In office 1881–1882
- Preceded by: Edward Cooper
- Succeeded by: Franklin Edson

Personal details
- Born: May 10, 1832 Ballylinan, County Laois, Ireland
- Died: March 21, 1904 (aged 71) New York City, New York, U.S.
- Resting place: Holy Cross Cemetery, Brooklyn
- Spouse: Lillius Gilchrist (after 1859)
- Relations: Michael P. Grace (brother)
- Children: 11, including Joseph Peter
- Parent(s): James Grace & Ellen Russell
- Occupation: Businessman, politician, philanthropist
- Known for: Founding co-benefactor of the Grace Institute

William Russell Grace (May 10, 1832 – March 21, 1904) was an American politician, the first Roman Catholic mayor of New York City, and the founder of W. R. Grace and Company.

== Early life ==
Grace was born in Ireland in Riverstown near the Cove of Cork to James Grace and Eleanor May Russell (née Ellen) while the family was away from home, and raised on Grace property at Ballylinan in Queen County (now County Laois). He was a member of a prominent and well-to-do family who lived for a period at Brooklawn House on Love Lane (now Donore Avenue) in Dublin. In 1846, Grace sailed for New York against the wishes of his father, and worked as a printer's devil and a shoemaker's helper before returning to Ireland in 1848. For a period he attended Belvedere College before again leaving school.

His nephew, Cecil Grace, attempted a crossing of the English Channel in December 1910 in an airplane, flying from Dover to Calais. However, in coming back he became disoriented and over Dover flew northeast over the Goodwin Sands toward the North Sea and was lost.

== Career ==
William and his father, James Grace, traveled to Callao, Peru, in 1851, seeking to establish an Irish agricultural community. James returned home but William remained, where he began work with the firm of John Bryce and Co., as a ship chandler.

In 1854, the company was renamed Bryce, Grace & Company, in 1865, to Grace Brothers & Co., and then W. R. Grace and Company.

=== Reform politics ===
Opposing the famous Tammany Hall, Grace was elected as the first Irish American Catholic mayor of New York City in 1880. He conducted a reform administration attacking police scandals, patronage and organized vice; reduced the tax rate, and broke up the Louisiana Lottery. Defeated in the following election, he was re-elected in 1884 on an Independent ticket but lost again the following time. During his second term, Grace received the Statue of Liberty as a gift from France.

=== Philanthropy ===
Grace was a renowned philanthropist and humanitarian, at one point contributing a quarter of the aid delivered to Ireland aboard the steamship Constellation during the Irish Famine of 1879. In 1897, he and his brother, Michael, founded the Grace Institute for the education of women, especially immigrants.

== Personal life ==
On September 11, 1859, William was married to Lillius Gilchrist (1839–1922), the daughter of George W. Gilchrist, a prominent ship builder of Thomaston, Maine, and Mary Jane (née Smalley) Gilchrest. Together, William and Lillius had eleven children, including:

- Alice Gertrude Grace (born in South America, June 11, 1860), who married the New York architect Albert D'Oench in 1901.
- Florence F. Grace (born in South America, September 20, 1861; died September 27, 1861).
- Lilius Clemintina Grace (born in South America, October 24, 1864; died in Ireland, June 26, 1866).
- Agnes Isadora Grace (born in Brooklyn, N.Y., April 4, 1867; died in New York City, March 8, 1884).
- Mary Augusta Grace (born in Brooklyn, September 2, 1868; died there February 16, 1870).
- Lilius Annie Grace (born in Brooklyn, September 1, 1870; died there August 30, 1871).
- Joseph Peter Grace (born at Great Neck, N.Y., June 29, 1872; died there July 15, 1950).
- Lilias Juanita Grace (born in New York City, March 30, 1874), who married George Edward Kent on July 12, 1898.
- Louise Natalie Grace (born in New York City, December 23, 1875; died in North Hills, Long Island, New York in 1954).
- William Russell Grace, Jr. (born April 11, 1878; died in Aiken, South Carolina, March 31, 1943).
- Caroline S. Grace (born April 22, 1879; died April 21, 1882).

Grace died on March 21, 1904, at his residence, 31 East 79th Street, in New York City. His funeral was held at the Church of St. Francis Xavier on West 16th Street and he was buried at the Holy Cross Cemetery in Brooklyn. Grace Avenue in the Bronx, NY is named in his honor. His estate was valued at $25,000,000.

== See also ==
- W. R. Grace and Company

Political offices
Preceded by Edward Cooper	Mayor of New York City; 1881–1882	Succeeded by Franklin Edson
Preceded by Franklin Edson	Mayor of New York City; 1885–1886	Succeeded by Abram Hewitt
