= Grace (company) =

American chemical company

- Logo since 1974, by George Tscherny
- Type: Subsidiary
- Industry: Speciality chemicals
- Founded: 1854; 172 years ago
- Founder: William Russell Grace
- Headquarters: Columbia, Maryland, U.S.
- Key people: Ed Sparks, CEO effective April 2023
- Products: Specialty chemicals
- Number of employees: 4,000 (2020)
- Parent: Standard Industries
- Website: www.grace.com

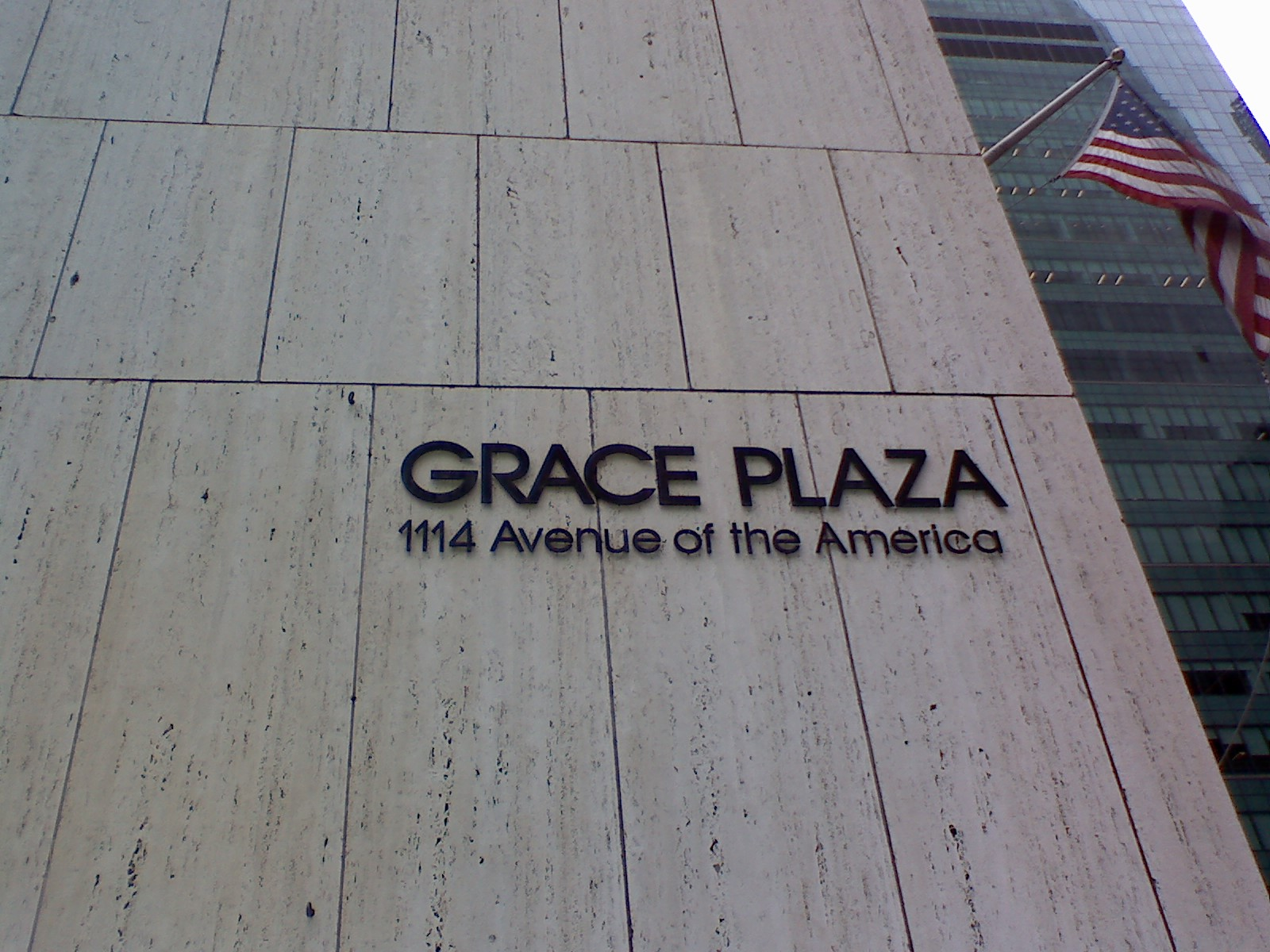
The plaza for the W.R. Grace Building in New York City (2009)

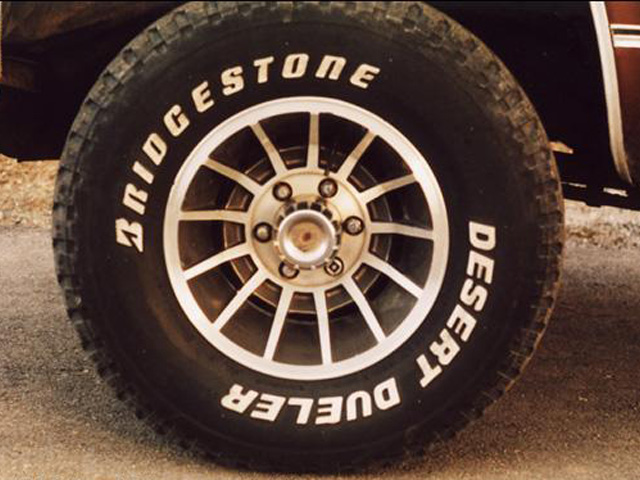
W. R. Grace & Co. 13 spoke 15"x8.5" aluminum wheel, OEM, 1978 Chevrolet K5 Blazer Cheyenne

Grace is an American chemical business based in Columbia, Maryland. It produces specialty chemicals and specialty materials in two divisions: Performance Catalyst Solutions and Material Technologies.

Performance Catalyst Solutions markets refining catalysts, polyethylene and polypropylene catalysts and related products and technologies used in petrochemical, refining, and other chemical manufacturing applications.

Material Technologies makes specialty materials, including silica-based and silica-alumina-based materials, which are used in commercial products such as coatings and paints, consumer products such as toothpaste, and in chemical process applications, as well as Fine Chemical Manufacturing Services.

For much of its early history, Grace's main business was in South America, in maritime shipping, railroads, agriculture, and silver mining, with 30,000 employees in Peru.

In the 1950s, Grace began to diversify and grew into a Fortune 100 worldwide conglomerate.

After emerging from a prolonged bankruptcy period of 12 years in 2014, the company spun off its other major operating divisions. In 2015, Grace separated into two independent public companies. Its Catalysts and Material Technologies business segments remained in Grace, and what would later become GCP Applied Technologies Inc. held its Grace Construction Products (GCP) and Darex Packaging Technologies businesses.

In September 2021, Standard Industries acquired Grace (the Catalysts and Material Technologies business segments). In September 2022, GCP Applied Technologies was acquired by Saint-Gobain, a global leader in construction chemicals.

In November 2025, Grace acquired Chevron U.S.A. Inc.'s interest in Advanced Refining Technologies (ART), a joint venture between the two companies that produces refining catalysts for lower-carbon fuels.

== History ==
The company was founded in 1854 in Peru by William Russell Grace at the age of 22. Grace left Ireland during the Great Famine and traveled to South America with his family. He went first to Peru to work for the firm of Bryce and Company as a ship chandler to the merchantmen harvesting guano, which was used as a fertilizer and gunpowder ingredient due to its high levels of phosphorus and nitrogen.

His brother, Michael P. Grace, joined the business, and in 1865 the company name was changed to Grace Brothers & Co. The company established headquarters in New York City in 1865. Working in fertilizer and machinery, the company was chartered in 1872 and incorporated in 1895.

From 1904 to 1907, Edward Eyre served as president after the death of William Grace. (Note: Edward Eyre and Michael P. Grace had, in 1892, urged William Russell Grace to apply the new steamship technology for powering the Grace Line ships.) In 1907, Joseph Peter Grace, the son of William Russell Grace, became president of the company. In 1914, the company created Grace National Bank.

In 1928, under Joseph Peter Grace's leadership, an agreement between Grace and Pan American formed Pan American-Grace Airways (or Panagra), a United States international carrier flying down the west coast of South America. Panagra ultimately evolved into a jet carrier flying from Miami and New York to South America before merging with Braniff Airways in 1967, becoming Braniff's South American network. These routes were sold to Eastern Air Lines in 1982 and then to American Airlines in 1990. In 1929, the vice president at that time, D. Stewart Inglehart, became president, and Joseph Peter Grace was elected chairman of the board of the company.

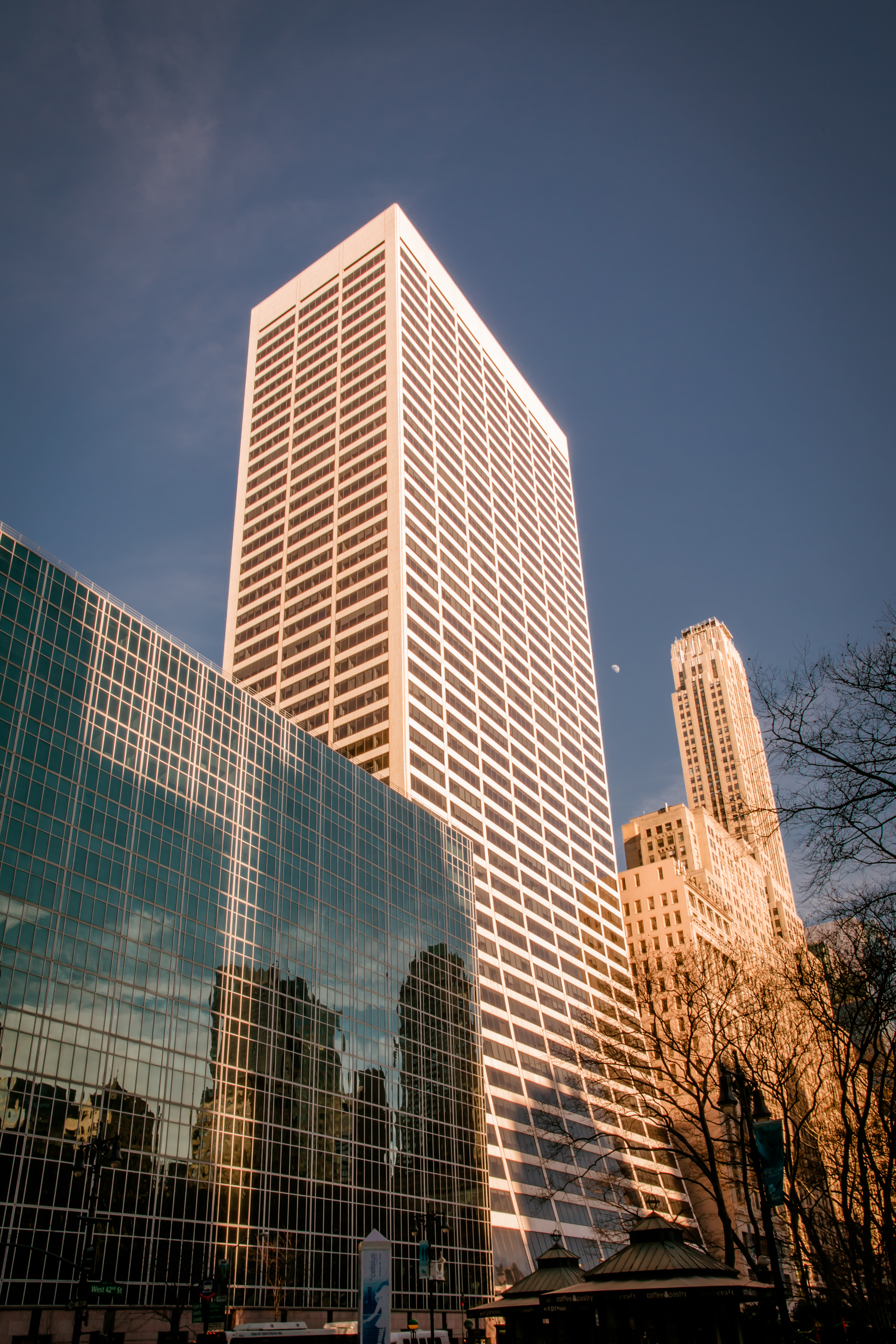
The W.R. Grace Building in New York City, where the company had its headquarters before relocating (1972-1991).

In 1945, the founder's grandson and Joseph Peter Grace's son, J. Peter Grace, became president. Under his leadership, the company owned the country's largest oil-drilling fleet as of 1990-1993, managed its subsidiary Grace Cocoa, which was one of the world's leading suppliers of cocoa bean and chocolate ingredients as of 1992, as well as sugar plantations in Peru, cotton mills in Chile, silver, clay, phosphate, and tin mines. Through its Davison Chemical Division, the company had processed various nuclear materials under a contract from the United States Atomic Energy Commission (AEC). (Note: Davison processed unirradiated uranium scrap for enriched uranium for the AEC for the development of nuclear weapons as well as processed thorium for civilian and U.S. Navy nuclear reactors.)

New companies such as Grace Petroleum, Grace Drilling, and Grace Healthcare were created under the umbrella of the Grace Corporation. Grace owned a food group that operated 900 chain restaurant locations, and a retail division with chains for sporting goods, home improvement, jewelry, aftermarket automotive parts and leather goods. The company operated fertilizer companies, confectioners and beverage companies, including Miller Brewing. Grace pioneered genetic engineering at its Agricetus division in Wisconsin, and human gene therapy at its Aurigent Pharmaceuticals group. The company constructed a 160-acre research complex, the Washington Research Center, in Columbia, Maryland. It also commissioned the New York City skyscraper, the W. R. Grace Building, as its world headquarters, in midtown Manhattan, where it directed worldwide operations, including Grace Container Products.

=== 1950s ===
In 1953, the company became a public company via an initial public offering on the New York Stock Exchange. In 1954, the company acquired Davison Chemical Company and Dewey & Almy Chemical Company, entering the specialty chemicals and specialty materials industries and establishing the basis for the current product lines. In 1955, the company elected a chairman of the company who was not a member of the Grace family, which was a first in the 101-year history of company. The company appointed Charles E. Wilson, who was the former CEO of General Electric. His predecessor for his position was William Grace Holloway.

=== 1960s ===
In November 30, 1960, Grace announced a multi-million dollar expansion of its polymer chemicals division. In December 1969, Grace sold Grace Shipping Company to Prudential Lines for $445 million.

=== 1970s ===
In 1970, Grace purchased FAO Schwartz. In the following year, Grace acquired the Italian food company Barilla. In that same year, Grace reported 1971 earnings of $2 billion and was 47th largest industrial in the Fortune 500 survey for that year. In 1972, W. R. Grace signed a 30-year lease for its new headquarters at the building that would become known as the W.R. Grace Building. In 1977, Grace purchased Del Taco Restaurants, Incorporated. In 1978, the proposed merger of Grace and King's Department Stores was called off. The addition of the department stores would have added $325 million in sales revenue to what was $1 billion in revenue from restaurants and retail for Grace at that time.

==== Chemed ====
In 1970, Grace created the Chemed Corporation, which purchased, operated, and divested subsidiaries engaged in diverse business activities. It managed VITAS healthcare and Roto-Rooter for Grace and still manages these two companies to this day. Eleven years later the formation of the corporation, Chemed ceased being a subsidiary of Grace and became a standalone company in 1981.

=== 1980s ===
In February 1981, the company announced a joint venture with Netherlands retail giant Vroom & Dreesmann, which gave its Dutch partner 50% buy-in to many of its retail stores. In 1987, Grace built a can sealant plant in Minhang, China, near Shanghai, becoming the first wholly foreign-owned, private company to do business in The People's Republic of China.

In 1989, Grace sold Grace Equipment, an equipment rental company primarily for the petrochemical and construction industry to Companie Francaise de l'Afrique Occidentale (CFAO) of Paris for $305 million. In that same year, Grace did a public offering for 16.6% of its Grace Energy Corporation, which was a company that supplied services and equipment to the oil and gas industry and was involved in oil and gas exploration and development and coal mining as well. The public offering raised approximately $100 million.

=== 1990s ===
In 1990, following the Grace's Grace Energy public offering in 1989, Grace Energy purchased all of the minority shares of its common stock of its Grace Drilling from Panhandle Eastern Corporation, which gave Grace Energy 99.45% ownership of Grace Drilling.

In 1992, Grace sold its 21%-percent interest of Grace Cocoa (Grace Cocoa Associates, LP,), for $300 million. Grace Cocoa was classified as a discontinued operation by Grace in 1993, but due to market conditions, the Grace later sold the rest of the company along with its paper drying, polymer, and filtration units in 1996 for over $300 million.

In 1995, Albert Costello became the CEO of the company, replacing J. Peter Grace, as well as became the new president, replacing J.P. Bolduc. Costello was the former CEO and chairman of the board at American Cyanamid (1993-1994). Bolduc (CEO from 1993-1995) was considered to have successfully sold off some of the unprofitable noncore businesses and to have expanded some of the successful businesses within the company at that point in time.

=== 2000s ===
In 2001, Grace began its multiyear process for filing for bankruptcy in the U.S. Bankruptcy Court for the District of Delaware. When the bankruptcy filing was announced, the company was reported to be involved in approximately 110,000 asbestos-related lawsuits. This number would later be reported to be 125,000. In 2005, Grace was charged with violating the Clean Air Act because of released asbestos from its vermiculite mine in Libby, Montana. In that same year, the State of New Jersey announced that is will sue Grace over its operation of the Zonolite (vermiculite) plant in that state.

=== 2010s ===
In 2010, Grace received approval from the U.S. Bankruptcy Court for the merger with Synthetec, which is a company that had developed and manufactured amino acid and peptide products as well as proprietary custom chiral intermediates primarily for the pharmaceutical industry. In 2014, the Grace bankruptcy process terminated. However, some legal procedures continued into the next decade.

In February 2016, Grace completed the corporate spin-off of GCP Applied Technologies, which was also as a public trading corporation on the NYSE. Grace shareholders receive GCP stock on 1:1 ratio. GCP Applied Technologies consisted of the concrete admixture and related products company Grace Construction Products (GCP) and Darex, a packaging technologies business unit.

In July 2016, Grace acquired the global polyolefin catalysts business unit from BASF.

=== 2020 ===
In June 2021, the company continued with acquisitions for polyolefin catalysts business units and acquired the polyolefin catalysts unit of Albemarle Corporation for $416 million. Grace stated that "the deal will strengthen its position in single-site and metallocene catalysts for polyolefins and Ziegler-Natta catalysts for polyethylene." In September 2021, Standard Industries acquired the company. Standard Industries purchased the company for $70 per share, which was approximately a $7 billion transaction at that time.

In September 2022, Saint-Gobain announced the acquisition of GCP Applied Technologies for $32.00 per share, in cash, or approximately $2.3 billion for the purchase. With the transaction, GCP was delisted from the stock exchange.

=== Incorporation ===
There are two accounts of the incorporation date of W. R. Grace & Co. According to The New York Times, the company was incorporated as part of the estate and successor planning in 1895. The three brothers consolidated most of their holdings into a new private company, incorporated in West Virginia, called W. R. Grace & Company. The consolidation involved W. R. Grace & Co. of New York, Grace Brothers & Co. of Lima, Peru, Grace & Co. of Valparaíso, Chile, William R. Grace & Co. of London, and J. W. Grace & Co of San Francisco.

According to its website, W. R. Grace & Co. was incorporated in Connecticut in 1899. The listed capital of $6 million did not include Grace Brothers & Co. Limited in London or its branches in San Francisco, Lima, and Callao, Peru, nor Valparaíso, Santiago, and Concepción, Chile.

J. Louis Schaefer, who joined the company as a boy, played a key role in not only W. R. Grace & Company, in which he became a vice president, but also as president of Grace National Bank. Schaefer was a co-executor of the estate of Michael Grace with William's son and corporate successor, Joseph Peter Grace Sr.. J. Louis Schaefer died in 1927.

=== Shipping ===
House Flag for Grace Line

For most of its history, Grace's main business was cargo shipping, operating the Grace Line. To move cargo from Peru to North America and Europe, including guano and sugar, and noticing the need for other goods to be traded, William Grace founded a shipping division. Grace Line began service in 1882, with ports of call between Peru and New York. Regular steamship service was established in 1893, with a subsidiary called the New York & Pacific Steamship Co., that operated under the British flag. Ships built outside the United States before 1905 were banned from the US registry. US-flag service began in 1912 with the Atlantic and Pacific Steamship Company. The activities of both companies and the parent firm were consolidated into the Grace Steamship Company beginning in 1916. The firm originally specialized in traffic to the west coast of South America then later expanded into the Caribbean.

Grace acquired the Pacific Mail Steamship Company in 1916.

In 1916, Grace acquired a controlling interest in the Pacific Mail Steamship Company. In 1921, Pacific received five 535 ft. President class ships from the United States Shipping Board for transpacific operation. In 1923, the US Shipping board decided to place the five ships up for bid and Dollar Shipping Company won the bid. With no large ships for the transpacific operations, Grace sold the Pacific Mail, its registered name, and goodwill to Dollar. Now without a transpacific service, Grace did not need the six intercoastal freighters and sold them to the American Hawaiian Line. At this time, Grace formed the Panama Mail Steamship Company, to operate the smaller ships that were formerly owned and used by the Pacific Mail in the Central American trade. These ships were not involved in the sale to Dollar.

On the death of William R. Grace in 1904, he was succeeded by William L. Sauders as company president followed by Joseph Peter Grace Sr. (1872–1950) who became president in 1907. In 1938, the Colombian Line merged with Grace Line bringing an end to the Colombian Line. During World War II, Grace Lines operated transport for the U.S. War Shipping Administration, including the SS Sea Marlin.

J. Peter Grace took over management of the company after his father suffered a stroke in 1945. After the war, the Grace line operated 23 ships totaling 188,000 gross tons, and 14 more on bareboat charters.

In 1960, the Grace Line, inspired by the pioneering efforts of Sea-Land Service, Matson Navigation, and Seatrain Lines, sought to begin containerizing its South American cargo operations by converting the conventional freighters Santa Eliana and Santa Leonor into fully cellular container ships. The effort was stymied by the opposition of longshoremen in New York and Venezuela, and the ships were repeatedly laid up idle and were ultimately sold to the domestic container line Sea-Land Service in 1964. In 1963 Grace made a second attempt to containerize its South American trade when it ordered the four M-class combination passenger-cargo ships Santa Magdalaena, Santa Maria, Santa Mariana, and Santa Mercedes with partial cellular holds, but they were no more successful as mixing conventional break-bulk cargo and containers in the same ship negated the operating economies that full containerization promised.

In 1970, Grace Line was sold to Prudential Lines for $44.5 million, with the merged company renamed Prudential Grace Line. It was taken over by Delta Steamship Lines in 1978, thereby extinguishing the name Grace in ocean shipping. Subsequently, Delta Steamship Lines was acquired and consolidated by Crowley Maritime in 1982.

=== Gallery ===
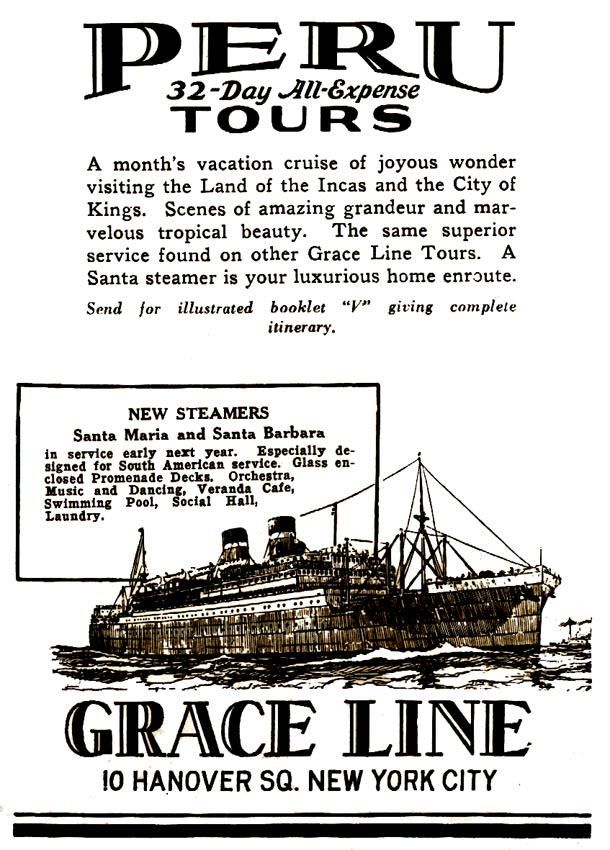
Grace Line advertisement (1928)

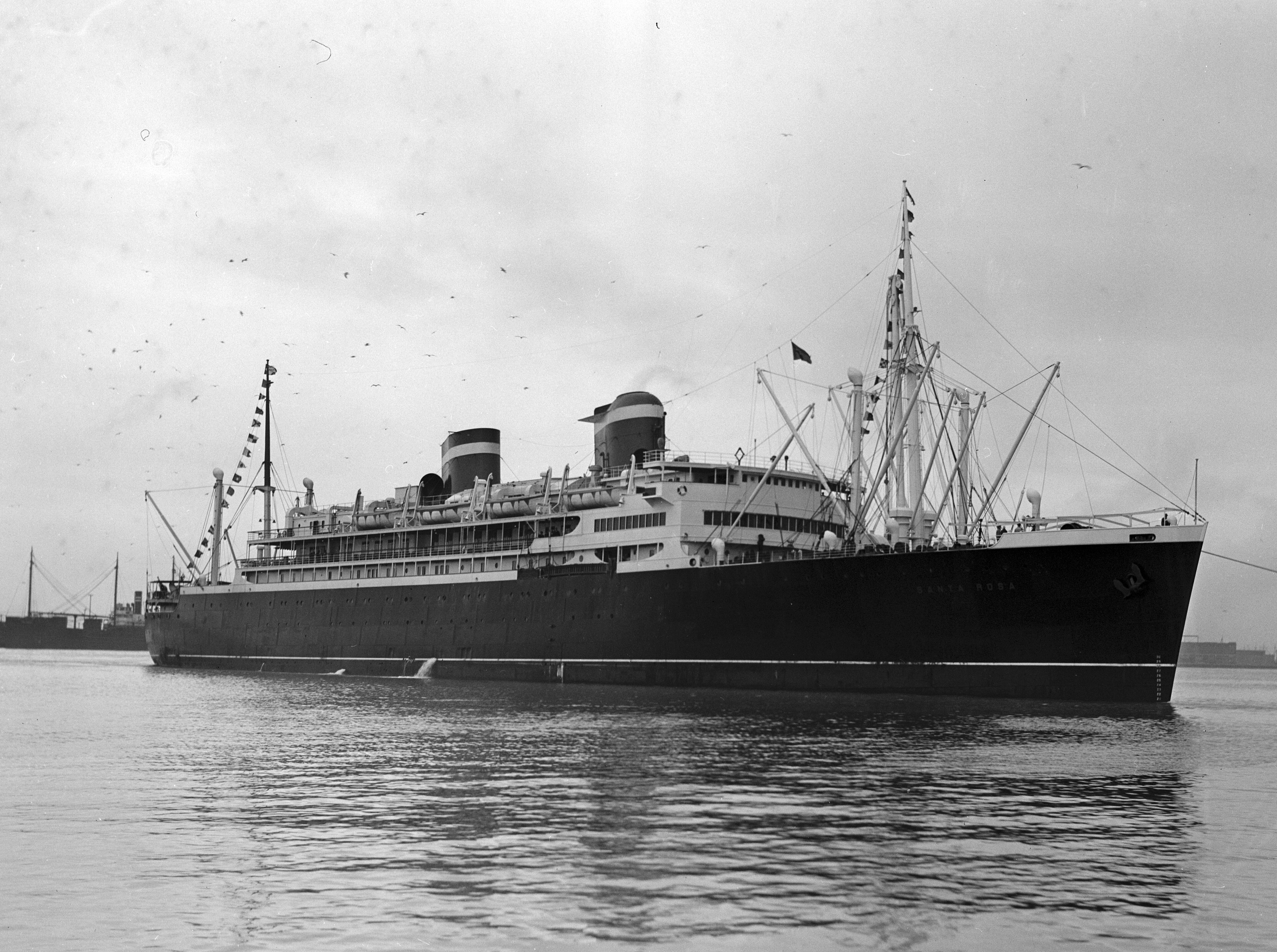
S.S. Santa Rosa, 1932.

=== Chemical industry ===
J. Peter Grace became CEO and president of Grace in 1945. Under the new leadership, the company began diversifying from the established shipping industry and Latin American operations that it had created. The company went from 60% of sales volume for Latin American operations in the 1950s to 19% of sale volume in 1962. In 1954, the company bought Davison Chemical Company (founded by William T. Davison) and the Dewey & Almy Chemical Company (founded in 1919 by Bradley Dewey and Charles Almy). Chemical sales growth went from 6% of sales in 1950 to 55% in 1977. When J. Peter Grace in 1978 was asked what may have been the best decision by the company, he stated the following:

Well, I'd say buying Dewey & Almy. We paid $37 million when it was earning about $1.8 million, at about 20 times earnings. Today, its earning about $60 million.

=== Property nationalized ===
In 1974, the Peruvian government nationalized properties in Peru owned by the company. Harold Logan, Grace's executive vice president, stated the company would join in governmental-level talks over compensation of expropriated American concerns. The loss of Grace's properties in Peru began in 1969 when 25,000 acres of sugarcane plantations were taken over in agrarian reform. The sugar lands were at Paramonga, 110 miles north of Lima, and at Cartavio, near Trujillo, 200 miles farther up the coast. Grace retained small mining operations producing copper, tin, and silver, in southern Peru, about 100 miles north of Juliaca. Jose E. Flores, head of W. R. Grace S.A. Peru, closed the mining operations for Grace in Latin America when the government of Peru nationalized the remaining interests.

=== Airline ===
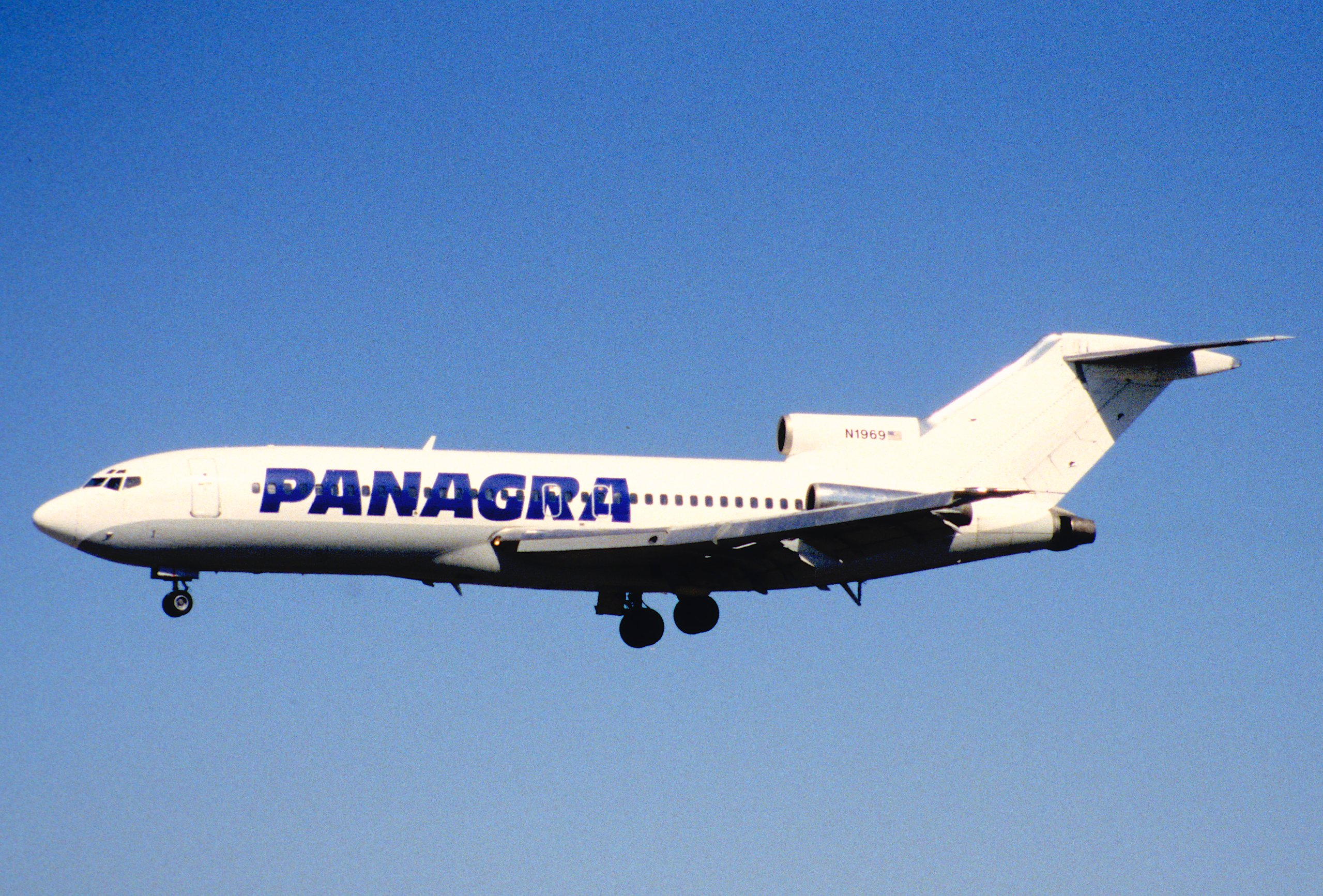
Panagra Airways Boeing 727-23

In 1928, Grace and Pan American Airways jointly formed Pan American-Grace Airways known as Panagra, establishing the first air link between North and South America, which began operation in 1929. In 1967, Panagra merged with Braniff International Airways.

=== Retail ===
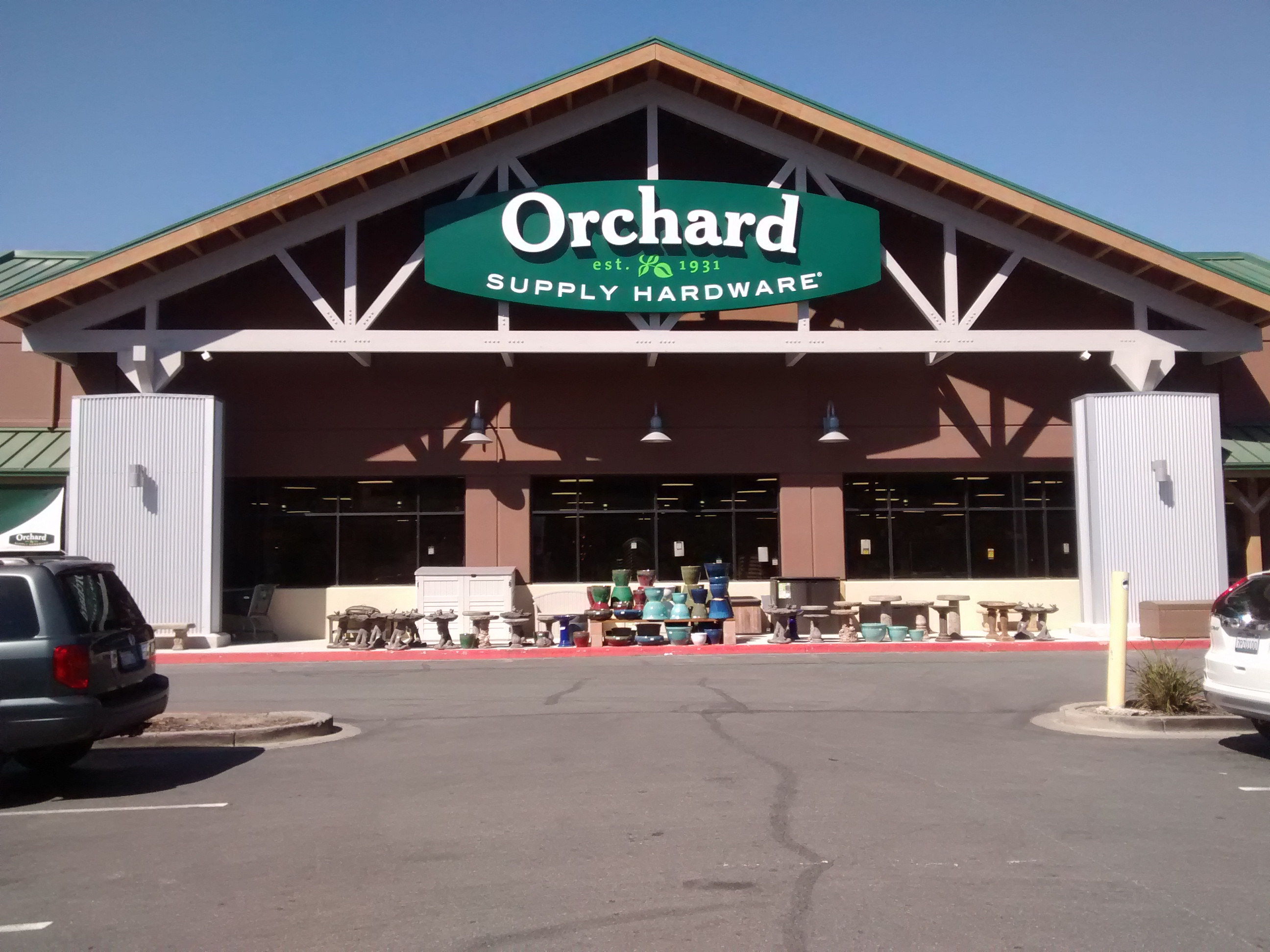
Orchard Supply Hardware

Prior to 1985, W. R. Grace operated a retail division. Among its brands were Orchard Supply Hardware and Home Centers West (sold to Wickes Companies in 1986), Handy City home improvement stores, Home Quarters Warehouse, J. B. Robinson Jewelers, Sheplers Western Wear, and Herman's World of Sporting Goods which it had acquired in 1970. These were sold to various buyers in 1985. In 1986, Grace announced the sales of its 56 percent stake in Herman's Sporting Goods to the Dee Corporation for $227 million.

=== Food and beverage industry ===
==== Beverage ====
In 1966, the company bought a 53% controlling stake in Miller Brewing for $36 million from Lorraine Mulberger, the granddaughter of Frederick Miller, who sold the stake for religious reasons. The company sold the Miller stake in 1969 to Philip Morris for $130 million, after first cancelling an agreed-upon sale to PepsiCo for $120 million. This resulted in a lawsuit.

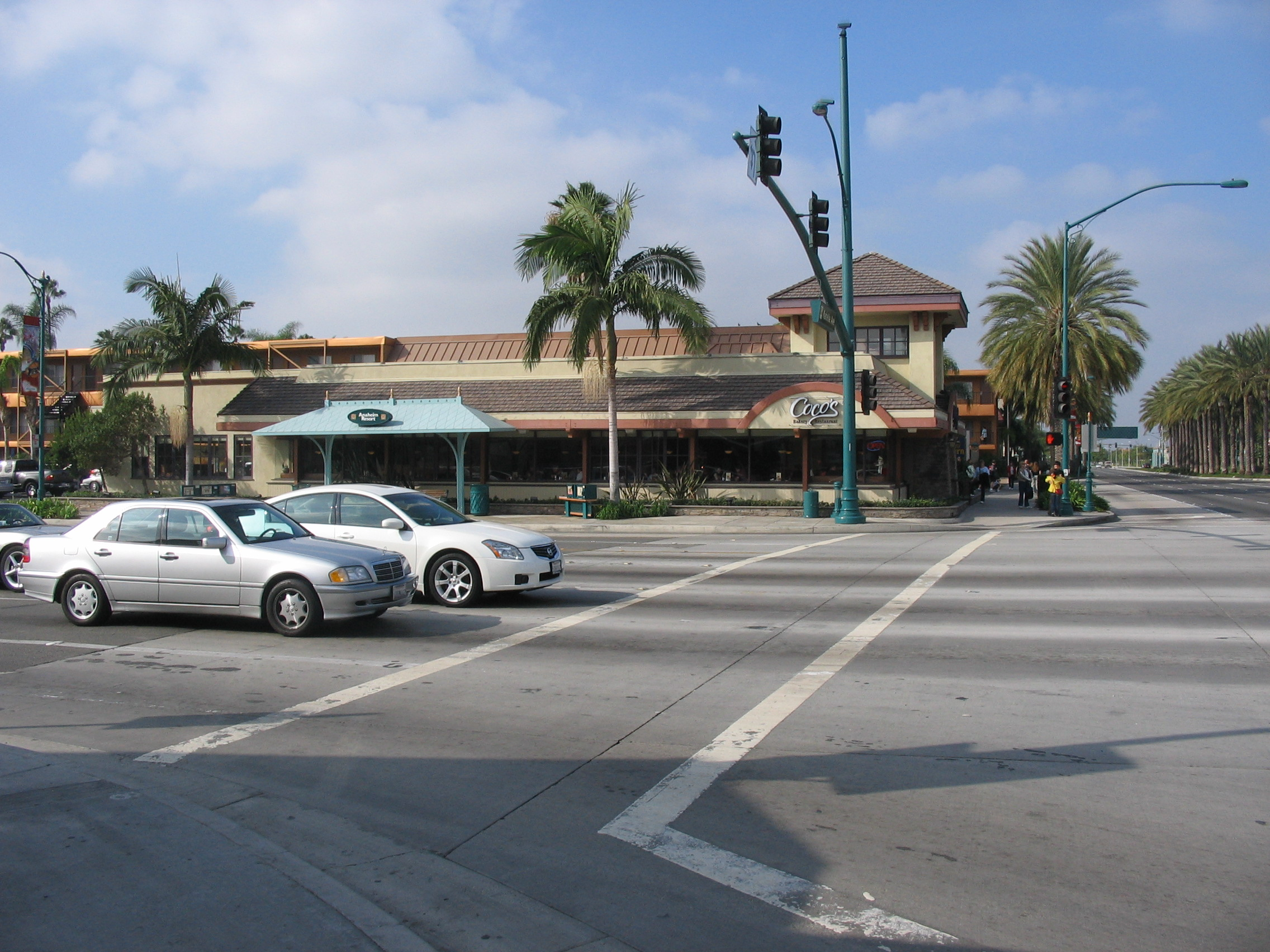
Coco's Bakery Restaurant

==== Food ====
In the 1980s, W. R. Grace had owned the following restaurants: American Cafe, Del Taco, Coco's Bakery, El Torito, Hungry Tiger and various restaurants it had purchased from General Mills. In 1986, the company sold its restaurants and retained a 49 percent interest in the restaurant operations. The restaurant chains included Coco's, Houlihan's Old Place, Charley Brown's and Bristol Bar and Grill. The transaction also included El Torito Restaurants Inc., of which Grace had owned 73 percent. Charles H. Erhart Jr., vice chairman of Grace, (Note: Three years later, Mr. Erhart, the former director of Chemed, would become president of Grace in 1989 and would retire in 1990. J. Peter Grace would stay on in his retirement years as CEO and chairman of the board.) said:

While it is still too early to make a definitive estimate, we expect total proceeds to Grace to exceed $500 million from this transaction.

In the process of leaving the restaurant business, the company later sold Del Taco to PepsiCo's Taco Bell in 1992.

=== Natural Resource Group ===
In 1975, the Natural Resources Group of W.R. Grace created the oil and gas contract drilling company of TRG Drilling Corporation. The new corporation started with three oil rigs were previously owned by Amini Oil and Magness Petroleum. In 1978, the Natural Resources Group announced that it will be combining the three oil companies owned by the company into Grace Petroleum Corporation. (Note: The three companies were Cleary Petroleum of Oklahoma (which would serve as the lead company), Teal Petroleum of Houston, and Polumbus Petroleum of Colorado.) In 1982, Grace announced that it was creating Grace Drilling Company of Oklahoma which would consolidate what was at that time its six drilling contractors into one company. The units had previously operated as part of the TRG Drilling Corporation and had generated $253 in sales revenue in 1981. The consolidation, the company said, would make it the largest land drilling operations contractor in the Lower 48 with 116 wells. (Note: The divisions were as follows: Grace-Bomac Drilling of Colorado; Grace-Glasscock Drilling of Louisiana; Grace-Sabre Drilling of Cushing, Oklahoma; Grace-Miller Drilling of Arkansas; Grace-France Drilling of Louisiana; Grace-TRG Drilling of Oklahoma City (Midcontinent Operations))

==== Divestiture of oil and gas interests ====
In 1993, Grace Drilling was sold to Nabors Loffland Drilling Company, a Nabors Industries subsidiary, for approximately $32 million, and Grace Petroleum Corporation was sold to an undisclosed buyer for $125 million, with its East Texas oilfields being sold to Samson Investment Company for $38 million. Grace agreed at that time to sell the following companies:

- Its Terminal Support Services, which was Grace Energy's liquid storage and terminaling subsidiary, to Kaneb Pipe Line Partners, L.P. for $63 million.
- Homco International, Inc ., Grace Energy's oil field service subsidiary, for $97.5 million.

In that same year, Grace Offshore sold each of its two divisions as separate entities for approximately $57 million in total. (Note: The Huthnance Drilling division was sold to a joint venture formed by Mike Mullen Energy Equipment Resources Inc. and Falcon Drilling Company, which had 1992 sales of $21 million.; The Booker Workover division was sold to Offshore Rigs L.L.C., which had 1992 sales of more than $23 million.)

== Headquarters ==
The company has its headquarters in Columbia, Maryland, an unincorporated census-designated place in Howard County, Maryland. Although W. R. Grace commissioned the W. R. Grace Building in New York City, built in 1971, the company no longer has any offices at that location.

Previously, the company had its headquarters in Boca Raton, Florida (1991–1999). Prior to its closing, the Boca Raton headquarters had about 130 employees. On January 27, 1999, it announced it was moving its administrative staff to the Columbia office and closing the Boca Raton headquarters. About 40 of the employees went to Columbia, and some employees went to Cambridge, Massachusetts. In 2014, the company emerged from a 13-year bankruptcy case stemming from asbestos claims and immediately built a new 90,000 sq ft headquarters building on its 160-acre Columbia campus.

== Contamination incidents ==
The company has been involved in several controversial incidents of proven and alleged corporate crimes, including exposing workers and residents of an entire town to asbestos contamination in Libby and Troy, Montana, water contamination (the basis of the book and film A Civil Action) in Woburn, Massachusetts, and an Acton, Massachusetts, Superfund site.

=== Asbestos ===
While Grace no longer makes asbestos or related products, at the time of its bankruptcy in 2001, it faced over 65,000 asbestos-related personal injury lawsuits involving over 129,000 claims.

On April 2, 2001, Grace and its subsidiaries in the United States filed voluntary petitions for Chapter 11 Bankruptcy reorganization in the Bankruptcy Court for the District of Delaware. The company was trying to find a resolution through federal court-supervised reorganization in response to the quickly growing number of asbestos-related bodily injury claims.

On September 19, 2008, Grace filed a revised plan of reorganization to the same court, jointly with the asbestos injury claimants. In January 2011, the court issued an order in favor of the new plan and in January 2012, the court denied all appeals and affirmed the plan. After a motion for reconsideration, the plan was reaffirmed on June 11, 2012.

On February 3, 2014, Grace emerged from the asbestos-related Chapter 11 bankruptcy, which took more than 12 years. Under the plan of reorganization approved by the court, all parties filings the asbestos-related claims were to direct their inquiry to either an asbestos personal injury trust or a separate asbestos property damage trust.

=== In popular culture ===
- The movie A Civil Action, starring John Travolta, was based on the Grace groundwater contamination lawsuits in Woburn, Massachusetts.
- The PBS television show P.O.V., which highlights independent films, in August 2007 premiered the movie Libby, Montana which documents the thousands of people in Libby, Montana, that have been exposed to and are suffering the effects of asbestos exposure. The show also discusses the criminal indictments of many Grace executives for covering up asbestos related illnesses and deaths.
- PBS also aired Dust to Dust, a documentary produced by Michael Brown Productions, Inc. in 2002. Dust to Dust reports on the more than 200 people who have died from asbestos exposure in Libby, Montana. The film focuses on the plights of several of these individuals and the damage done over almost 30 years while the mine was operated by W. R. Grace.
- NPR aired a piece on All Things Considered discussing the criminal charges against W. R. Grace. A U.S. attorney general alleges that the company and managers of the mine in Libby, Montana, knew about the dangers of the asbestos they were dumping into the air for over 20 years.
- On February 19, 2008, the NPR-produced radio show Here and Now broadcast a story about the film Libby, Montana, which details the asbestos contamination in the town of that name.
- On April 22, 2009, the television and radio program Democracy Now! broadcast two segments on the trial of W. R. Grace and some of its employees related to the asbestos contamination in Libby, Montana. Democracy Now! also broadcast a follow-up interview on May 12, 2009. This interview focused on reactions to the not-guilty verdict in the federal trial, where W. R. Grace and three former executives were acquitted on charges of knowingly exposing workers and townspeople to asbestos, and subsequently participating in a cover-up.

== Neem patent ==
In 1995, the European Patent Office (EPO) granted a patent on an anti-fungal product derived from the neem tree to the United States Department of Agriculture and W. R. Grace. The Indian government challenged the patent when it was granted, claiming that the process for which the patent had been granted had been in use in India for more than 2,000 years. In 2000, the EPO ruled in India's favour, but W. R. Grace appealed, claiming that prior art about the product had never been published in a scientific journal. On March 8, 2005, that appeal was lost and the EPO revoked the Neem patent.

== See also ==
- Anderson v. Cryovac
- Beatrice Foods
- Grace Institute
