= Hubert Beaumont Phipps =

Publisher, editor and breeder

- Born: November 12, 1905; London, England
- Died: August 15, 1969 (aged 62–63); Warrenton, Virginia, United States
- Occupation(s): Publisher, Racehorse owner/breeder
- Spouses: Carla Gordon; Phoebe Pleydell-Bouverie
- Children: 2, including Hubert G. Phipps
- Parent: John Shaffer Phipps & Margarita Celia Grace
- Relatives: Henry Phipps Jr. (grandfather)

Hubert Beaumont Phipps (November 12, 1905 – August 15, 1969) was a Virginia publisher and editor as well as a breeder of thoroughbred horses and purebred cattle. He was a member of the prominent Phipps family who made a fortune in steel as partners with Andrew Carnegie in the steel-making business in Pittsburgh, Pennsylvania.

== Biography ==
He was born on November 12, 1905, in London, England. Hubert Phipps married Carla Gordon. She died in 1950 and he subsequently married Lady Phoebe Pleydell-Bouverie, third daughter of William Pleydell-Bouverie, 7th Earl of Radnor, with whom he had two children. They divorced in 1963.

A former president of the Virginia Thoroughbred Association, Hubert Phipps bred and raced Thoroughbreds. He owned Rockburn Stud Farm in The Plains, Virginia, and raced under the name of Rockburn Farm.

Since 1936 he published and edited The Fauquier Democrat, a weekly newspaper in Fauquier County, Virginia, and was the president of the Loudoun Times-Mirror.

He died on August 15, 1969, at his Rockburn Farm estate.
