= Maturin Livingston Jr. =

American businessman (1816-1888)

Maturin Livingston
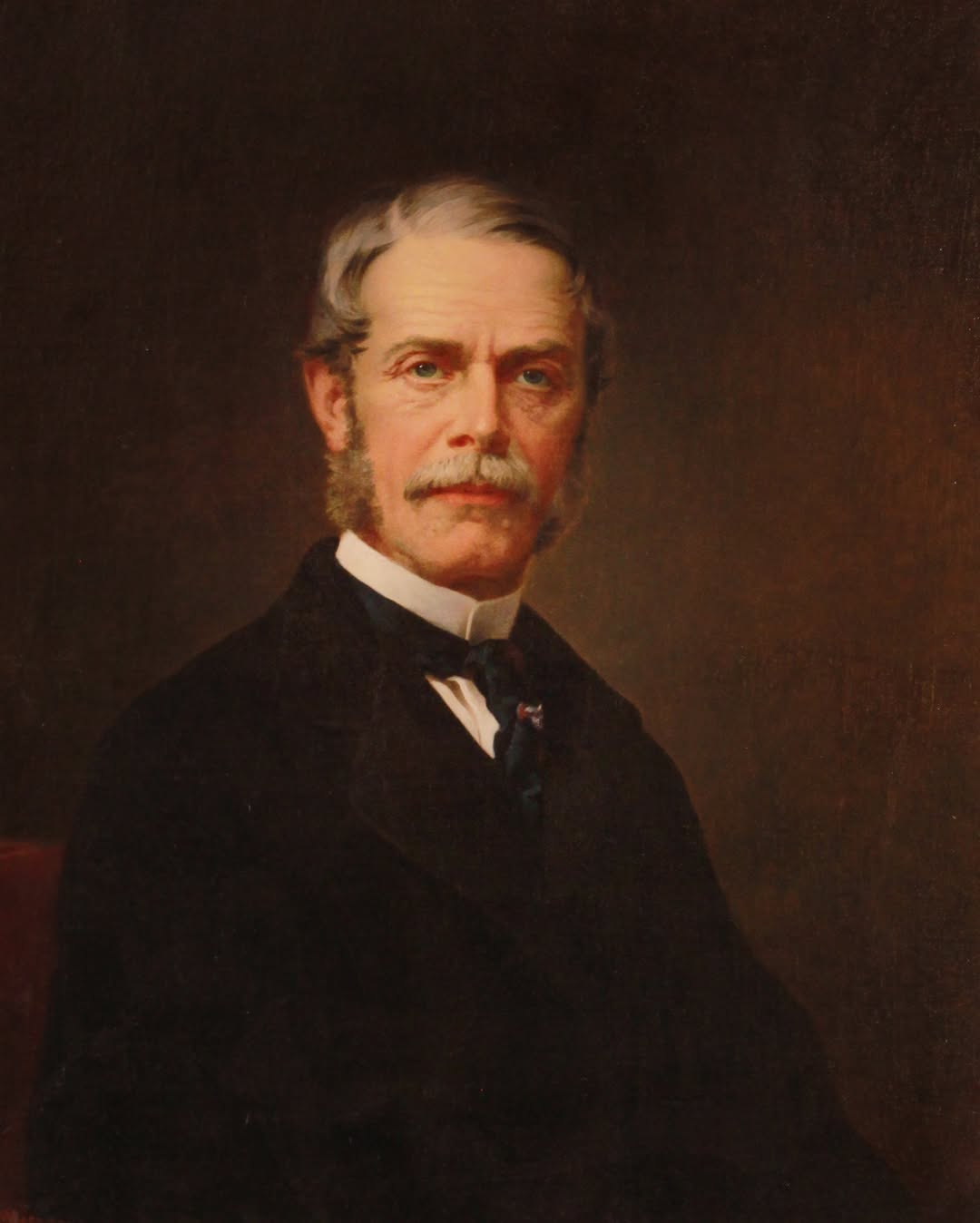
- Born: March 4, 1816; Staatsburg, New York, U.S.
- Died: November 29, 1888 (aged 72); New York City, New York, U.S.
- Spouse: Ruth Baylies (m. 1852)
- Children: Elizabeth Livingston; Ruth Livingston
- Parent(s): Maturin Livingston; Margret Lewis Livingston
- Relatives: Robert James Livingston (brother); Alexander Hamilton, Jr. (brother-in-law); Morgan Lewis (grandfather)

Maturin Livingston Jr. (March 4, 1816 – November 29, 1888), an American merchant who was a member of the prominent Livingston family.

== Early life ==
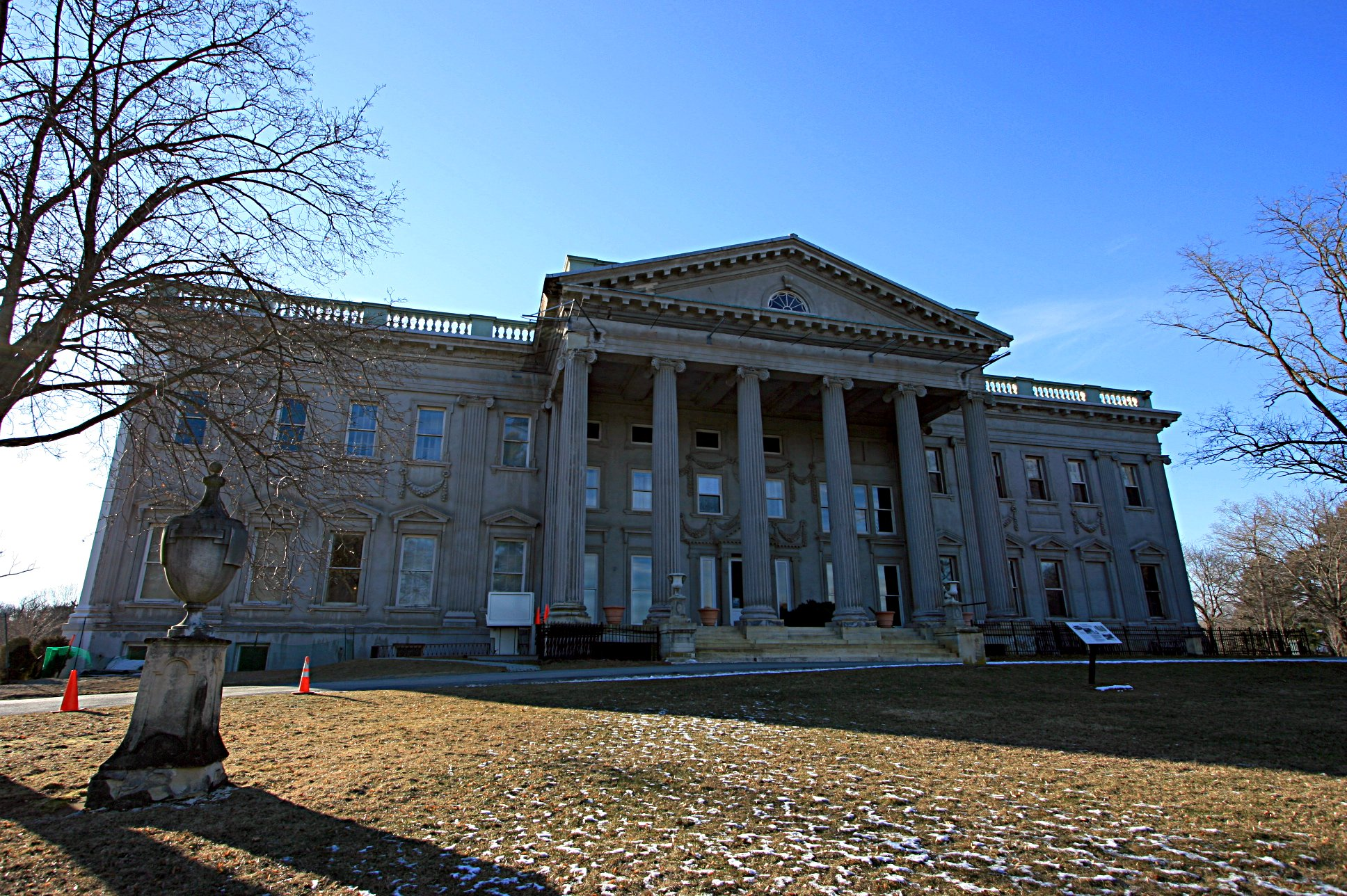
The Livingston mansion, the country home of the Mills family.

Livingston was born on March 4, 1816, in Staatsburg, New York. He was the son of Maturin Livingston (1769–1847) and Margaret (née Lewis) Livingston (1780–1860). He was one of twelve children, including: Morgan Lewis; Gertrude Laura; Julia; Alfred; Mortimer; Susan Mary; Robert James Livingston; Henry Beekman; and Angelica, who married Alexander Hamilton, Jr.

His paternal grandparents were Robert James Livingston and Susanna (née Smith) Livingston, sister of Chief Justice William Smith and daughter of Judge William Smith. His mother was the only daughter and sole heiress of his maternal grandparents, New York Governor Morgan Lewis and Gertrude (née Livingston) Lewis. His mother was also the niece of Chancellor Robert Livingston and the granddaughter of Judge Robert R. Livingston.

== Career ==
Livingston was engaged in mercantile business in New York as a young man.

In 1844, upon the death of his grandfather, his parents inherited Gov. Lewis's stately home Staatsburgh House in Staatsburg, Dutchess County, New York. Later, Livingston himself inherited the mansion which he later passed down to his younger daughter Ruth, which the couple used as a summer home and where they raised horses.

=== Society life ===
Livingston and his wife were both prominent in society. In 1892, a few years after his death, his widow was included in Ward McAllister's "Four Hundred", purported to be an index of New York's best families, published in The New York Times. Conveniently, 400 was the number of people that could fit into Mrs. Astor's ballroom.

== Personal life ==
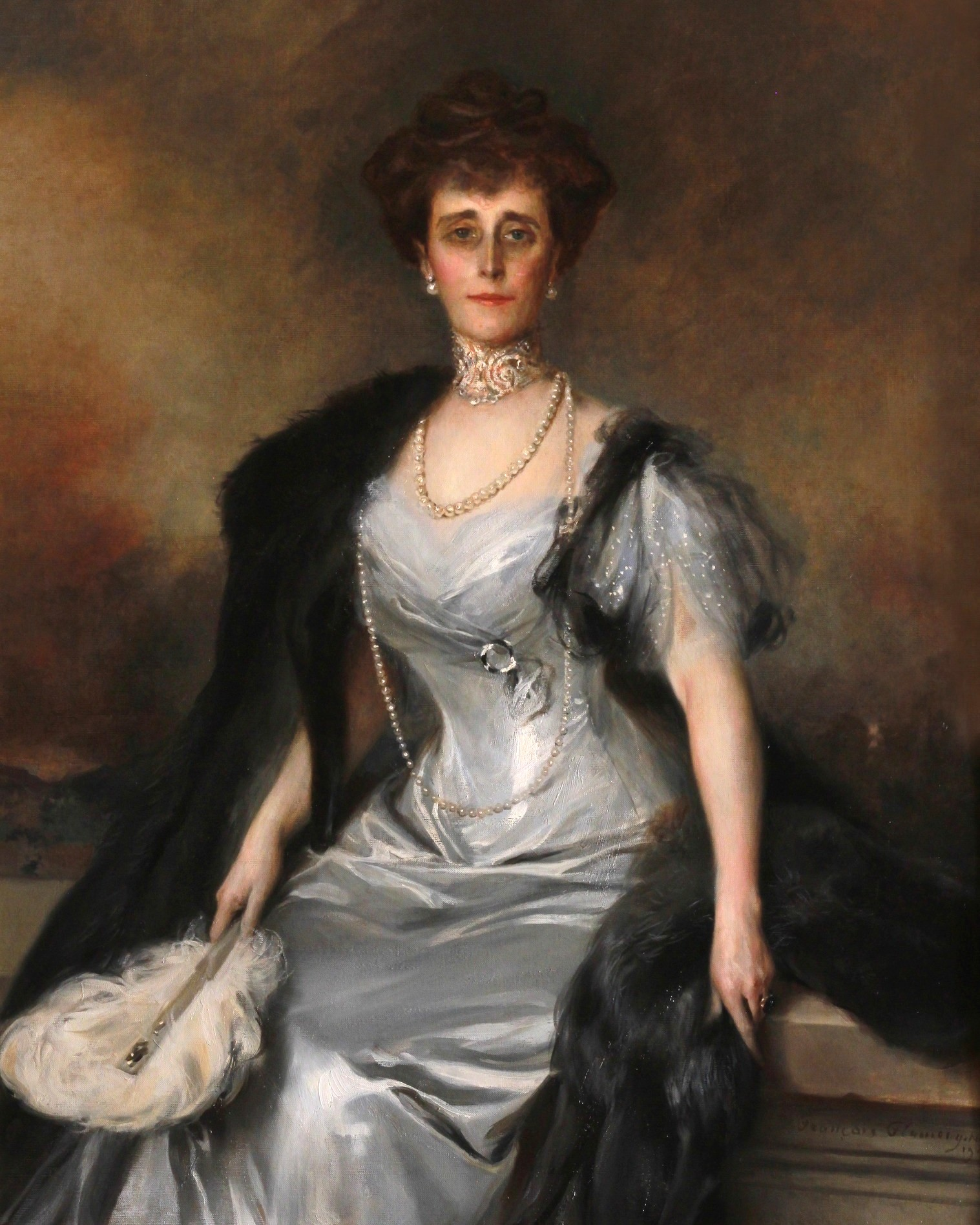
Portrait of his daughter Ruth Livingston Mills, by Francois Flemeng

On November 12, 1852, Livingston was married to Ruth Baylies (1827–1918), the daughter of Edmund and Elizabeth (née Payson) Baylies from Taunton, Massachusetts. Ruth's nephew was Edmund Lincoln Baylies Jr., the lawyer and prominent society member. Together, they were the parents of eight children, including two twin daughters who were the only children to survive their parents:

- Elizabeth Livingston (1855–1943), who married Member of Parliament William George Cavendish-Bentinck (1854–1909), the son of The Rt. Hon. George Augustus Frederick Cavendish-Bentinck and Prudentia Penelope Leslie.
- Ruth Livingston (1855–1920), who married financier Ogden Mills (1856–1929), the son of banker and philanthropist Darius Ogden Mills.

Livingston died at the residence of his son-in-law at 2 East 69th Street in New York City on November 29, 1888. In 1916, his widow's address was listed at 4 East 69th Street in New York.

=== Descendants ===
Through his daughter Elizabeth, he was the grandfather of two granddaughters, Mary Augusta Cavendish-Bentinck (1881–1913) and Ruth Evelyn Cavendish-Bentinck (1883–1978).

Through his daughter Ruth, he was the grandfather of Gladys Livingston Mills (1883–1970), who married Henry Carnegie Phipps; Jane Beatrice Mills (1883–1972), who married Bernard Forbes, 8th Earl of Granard; and Ogden Livingston Mills (1884–1937), who would become the 50th United States Secretary of the Treasury, and who married Margaret Stuyvesant Rutherford in 1911. After their divorce in 1919, he married Dorothy Randolph Fell, former wife of the banker John R. Fell, in 1924.
