= Morgan Lewis Livingston =

American heir

- Born: April 3, 1799; Staatsburg, New York, U.S.
- Died: November 3, 1869 (aged 70); New York City, New York, U.S.
- Education: United States Military Academy
- Spouse: Catharine Currie Manning (m. 1829)
- Children: 9
- Parent(s): Maturin Livingston; Margaret Lewis Livingston
- Relatives: Robert James Livingston (brother); Maturin Livingston Jr. (brother); Peter R. Livingston (uncle); Morgan Lewis (grandfather)

Morgan Lewis Livingston (April 3, 1799 – November 3, 1869), was an American heir and member of the prominent Livingston family from New York.

== Early life ==
Livingston was born on April 3, 1799, at his grandfather's home in Staatsburg in Dutchess County, New York. He was the eldest of twelve children born to Maturin Livingston (1769–1847), a former Recorder of New York City, and Margaret (née Lewis) Livingston (1780–1860). His younger siblings included Gertrude Laura Livingston, Julia Livingston, Alfred Livingston, Mortimer Livingston, Susan Mary Livingston, Robert James Livingston, Maturin Livingston Jr., Henry Beekman Livingston, Angelica Livingston, and Blanche Geraldine Livingston. His younger sister Angelica married Alexander Hamilton Jr., the son of Secretary of State James Alexander Hamilton (and grandson of Alexander Hamilton, the first Secretary of the Treasury).

His mother was the only daughter and sole heiress of New York Gov. Morgan Lewis and Gertrude (née Livingston) Lewis. His maternal grandmother was the daughter of Judge Robert Livingston of Clermont and Margaret (née Beekman) Livingston, and the sister of Chancellor Robert R. Livingston; Janet Livingston (who married Gen. Richard Montgomery); Margaret Livingston (who married N.Y. Secretary of State Thomas Tillotson); Henry Beekman Livingston; Catharine Livingston (who married Freeborn Garrettson); merchant John R. Livingston; Joanna Livingston (who married Lt. Gov. Peter R. Livingston); and Alida Livingston (who married U.S. Senator, Secretary of War, and Minister to France, John Armstrong, Jr.). His father inherited his maternal grandfather's estate, the Staatsburgh House in Staatsburg, upon the death of Lewis in 1844.

His paternal grandparents were Robert James Livingston and Susanna (née Smith) Livingston, herself the daughter of Chief Justice William Smith. His uncle was Peter R. Livingston and all of his Livingston family members were descended from Robert Livingston the Younger, through the Younger's eldest son, James Livingston.

== Career ==
On October 13, 1814, Livingston matriculated at the United States Military Academy at West Point with the class of 1819, along with Edward Butler, nephew of General Richard Butler and Col. Thomas Butler. Butler courted Livingston's sister Julia, but eventually married Frances Parke Lewis, daughter of Eleanor Parke Custis Lewis and Lawrence Lewis, and grand-niece of George Washington (and great-granddaughter of Martha Washington). Julia later married Maj. Joseph Delafield, brother of Maj. Gen. Richard and Dr. Edward Delafield.

Upon his father's death in 1847, his younger brother, Maturin Livingston Jr. inherited the family home in Staatsburgh, not Morgan, the eldest son.

== Personal life ==
On March 30, 1829, Livingston was married to Catharine Currie Manning (1809–1886) in New York City. She was the daughter of James Manning and Elizabeth (née Storm) Manning, and the younger sister of John Augustus Manning and William Henry Manning. Her paternal uncle was James Manning, the first President of Brown University, and her maternal grandfather was Thomas Storm, the Speaker of the New York State Assembly. Together, they were the parents of nine children, only two of whom married and had children, including:

- Gertrude Livingston (1829–1878), who died unmarried.
- Morgan Lewis Livingston Jr. (1831–1898), who died unmarried.
- Silvia Julia Livingston (1833–1895), who died unmarried.
- Rosalie Manning Livingston (1835–1874), who married Francis William Waldo (1836–1878), son of Horace Waldo and Sarah (née Hazard) Waldo, in 1858. After her death, he remarried to Gertrude Rhinelander Waldo.
- Mortimer Livingston (1837–1892), who married Maria McCartie in 1863.
- Annesley Livingston (1839–1870), who died unmarried.
- Julia Livingston (1841–1920), who died unmarried.
- James Manning Livingston (1843–1863), who was killed-in-action at the Battle of Gettysburg.
- Maturin Livingston (1849–1879), who died unmarried.

Livingston died on November 3, 1869, in New York City. He was buried in the St. James Episcopal Churchyard in Hyde Park in Dutchess County, New York.

=== Descendants ===
Through his daughter Rosalie, he was the grandfather of Rosalie Livingston Waldo (1859–1907) and Katherine Livingston Waldo (1863–1899), who were both the elder half-sisters of Rhinelander Waldo, the New York City Police and Fire Commissioner, from their father's second marriage to Gertrude Rhinelander Waldo. Rosalie, who was born in Newport, Rhode Island, and died in Paris, France, did not marry. Katherine married Preble Tucker (1860–1944), but died without issue at the age of thirty-five.

Through his son Mortimer, he was the grandfather of Frances Livingston (b. 1864); Morgan Lewis Livingston (1866–1919), who married Ida Mary (née Lockwood) Walters, daughter of English immigrant Joseph Charles Lockwood, in 1903; Katherine Manning Livingston (b. 1868), who married George Winthrop Fallon in 1893; Robert James Livingston (b. 1870), who married Charlotte Ames, daughter of Daniel Burnett Ames in 1898; Julia Livingston (1872–1872), who died young; Alice Livingston (1874–1876); Edward Mortimer Livingston (b. 1876), who married Catherine Cecilia Chamberlain, daughter of Willis Henry Chamberlain; and Harold Maturin Livingston (b. 1880).
