= Thomas Storm =

American politician

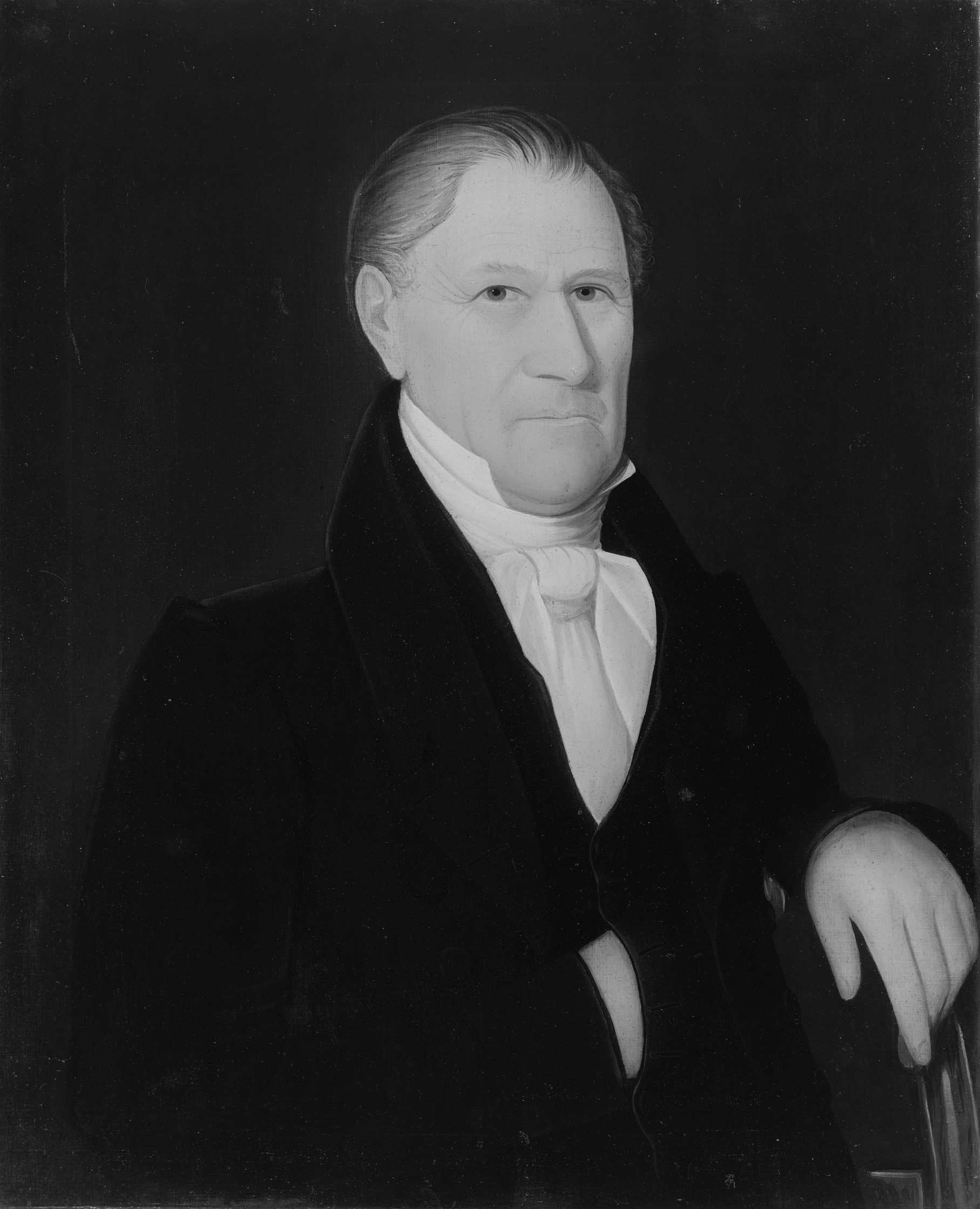
- Portrait of Storm by Ammi Phillips, c. 1830, at the Metropolitan Museum of Art

Speaker of the New York State Assembly
- In office 1802–1803
- Preceded by: Samuel Osgood
- Succeeded by: Alexander Sheldon

Personal details
- Born: September 8, 1748 Hopewell, Province of New York, British America
- Died: August 4, 1833 (aged 84) New York City, New York, U.S.
- Party: Democratic-Republican
- Spouse: Elizabeth Graham (m. 1771; died 1832)
- Children: 10

Thomas Storm (September 8, 1748 – August 4, 1833) was an American Revolutionary war officer and state legislator, rising to Speaker of the New York State Assembly in 1802.

== Early life ==
Thomas was born in Hopewell, Dutchess County, New York, on September 8, 1748. He was the eldest son of Maria (née van Sickels) Storm and Garrit Storm, for whom the hamlet of Stormville in East Fishkill is named. Among his siblings was younger brother was John Storm, who married Susanna Brinckerhoff.

== Career ==
Between 1775 and 1777, he was a Captain in the 2nd Dutchess County Militia, and served in the Battle of White Plains. When the regiment was disbanded in 1777, Thomas was assigned to the 2nd New York Regiment, and served at the Battle of Monmouth, and later at the Battle of Yorktown. He served under Col. Van Rensselaer's Regiment and in Col. Jeremiah Hogeboom's Regiment in 1770.

In 1776 and 1777, he was a member of the Committee of Safety. Thomas became a member of the New York State Assembly, from Dutchess County in 1781 to 1784, and from New York County in 1798 and 1803. He unanimously elected Speaker of the New York State Assembly as a Democratic-Republican in 1802 and 1803.

In 1807, Thomas ran for Lieutenant Governor of New York on the ticket with the incumbent Governor Morgan Lewis, but lost to the incumbent Lieutenant Governor John Broome. Storm was also a member of The New York Society Library.

== Personal life ==
On March 23, 1771, he married Elizabeth Graham (1752–1832), a daughter of the Rev. Chauncey Graham and Elizabeth (née van Wyck) Graham. The wedding took place shortly after the death of his paternal grandfather, who was known as the pioneer Thomas Storm, and his father Garrit gifted the couple a house at the "corner of Madam Brett's Road and the crossroad to the future Stormville," which is today known as the Storm–Adriance–Brinckerhoff House. Together, they were the parents of:

- Elizabeth Storm (1771–1851), who married James Manning, a relative of James Manning, the first president of Brown University.
- Gerrit Storm (1774–1776), who died young.
- John Storm (1776–1794), who died unmarried in St. Domingo.
- Gerrit Storm (1778–1851), who married Susan Matilda Gouverneur (1779–1835) in 1807. Susan, a daughter of Isaac Gouverneur, was the widow of Saumuel Murgatroyd.
- Mary Storm (1779–1845), who married Henry J. Bleecker. After his death, she married John King (c. 1777–1819).
- Thomas Hall Storm (b. 1781), who died unmarried in the interior of South America.
- Anne Storm (b. 1783), who married Peter Kuhn of Philadelphia, an associate of her brother Thomas. They divorced and she married Jonathan Robinson, a son of U.S. Senator Jonathan Robinson.
- Hester Storm (b. c. 1785–1832), who married Charles F. Bunner of Philadelphia.
- Catherine Storm (b. c. 1787), who married Ruggles Hubbard.
- Stephen Storm (1788–1862), who married his cousin Jane Maria Graham (1790–1874).

His wife died on July 7, 1832. He died on August 4, 1833, in New York City. He is buried at Trinity Churchyard in New York City.

=== Descendants ===
Through his eldest daughter Elizabeth, he was a grandfather of Catharine Currie Manning (1809–1886), who married Morgan Lewis Livingston, himself the eldest of twelve children born to Maturin Livingston, a former Recorder of New York City.

Through his son Gerrit, he was a grandfather of Louise Matilda Storm (1810–1883), who married Robert James Livingston, also a son of Maturin Livingston, in 1833.

Political offices
| Preceded by Samuel Osgood | Speaker of the New York State Assembly; 1802–1803 | Succeeded by Alexander Sheldon |
