= Christina Anne Jessica Cavendish-Bentinck =

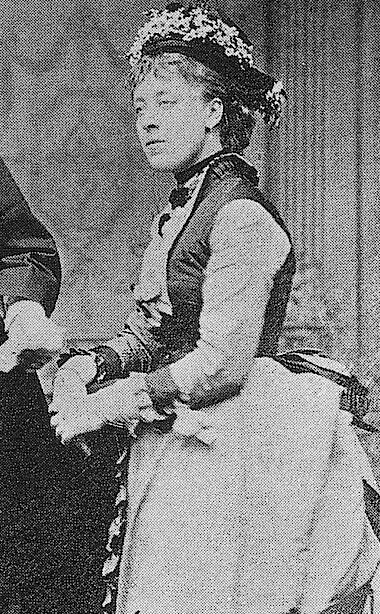
- Born: July 4, 1852
- Died: June 2, 1912 (aged 59); London
- Spouse(s): Sir Tatton Sykes
- Children: Mark Sykes
- Parent(s): George Cavendish-Bentinck; Prudentia Penelope Leslie
- Relatives: Venetia James, William George Cavendish-Bentinck, Frederick Cavendish-Bentinck

Christina Anne Jessica Cavendish-Bentinck, Lady Sykes (July 4, 1852 – June 2, 1912) was a British writer and novelist. Familiarly known as "Jessie", she published under the names Jessica Sykes and J. A. C. Sykes.

Christina Anne Jessica Cavendish-Bentinck was born on July 4, 1852. She was the daughter of politician George Cavendish-Bentick and Prudentia Penelope Leslie Cavendish-Bentick. Her siblings included Venetia James and William George Cavendish-Bentinck. Intelligent and opinionated, she studied art in Paris and idolized John Ruskin.

Thanks to the machinations of her formidable mother, at age 18 she was engaged to the wealthy 48-year old Sir Tatton Sykes, 5th Baronet. They were married at Westminster Abbey in 1874. They would have one child, Colonel Mark Sykes. The marriage was disastrous for both parties. They had little in common and Tatton Sykes was abusive and miserly, so Jessie Sykes turned to affairs, drinking, and gambling. She amassed significant debts. One creditor sued, resulting in a public scandal when Tatton Sykes testified that he did not sign a promissory note to this creditor.

Christina Anne Jessica Cavendish-Bentinck died on 2 June 1912 at her home in London.

== Writing ==
Following her attempt to work in a Natal hospital during the Boer War, in 1900, she published Side Lights on the War in South Africa. She became a regular contributor to the periodicals Review of the Week and The Candid Friend. She also founded her own publication covering gossip and politics, The Sunrise, which soon merged with the revival of The Rambler. She published another work of non-fiction, The New Reign of Terror in France (1903) and three novels, romans à clef loosely based on the lives of herself and others. Of the first, Algernon Casterton (1903), George Bernard Shaw wrote to James Huneker: "Would you like to see what the English think of the Americans? Read “Algernon Casterton” by Lady Sykes, a recent English novel. There you will see the English conception of the American woman as a cold blooded, sexless prostitute, who sells herself without scruple and without affection to the man who can give her the best time in London society, and who makes her husband pay for her favors as if he were a stranger." The MacDonnells (1905) was based on her mother's family and the title character of Mark Alston (1908) was inspired by Ruskin. The heroine of the latter, young Portia Bulstrode, wishes to marry Alston, but her mother wants her to marry the "misogynistic peer" Lord Beechfield, who is 48.

She also wrote a play which she sent to Herbert Beerbohm-Tree in 1904, but he thought it was too risqué to stage.

== Bibliography ==
- Side Lights on the War in South Africa, Being Sketches Based on Personal Observation during a Few Weeks' Residence in Cape Colony and Natal. London: T. Fisher Unwin, 1900.
- The New Reign of Terror in France, Being an Unbiased Statement as to the Present Condition of Public Affairs in that Country. London: Bickers and Son, 1903.
- Algernon Casterton: Some Experiences During the First Twenty-Five Years of his Life. London: Bickers, 1903.
- The MacDonnells. London: Heinemann, 1905.
- Mark Alston: An Impression. London: E. Nash, 1908.
