= Robert James Livingston =

American businessman

- Born: December 11, 1811; New York City, US
- Died: February 22, 1891 (aged 79); New York City, US
- Education: Yale University
- Spouse: Louise Matilda Storm (m. 1832; died 1883)
- Children: 2
- Parent(s): Maturin Livingston; Margaret Lewis
- Relatives: Peter R. Livingston (uncle); Morgan Lewis (grandfather); Alexander Hamilton Jr. (brother-in-law)

Robert James Livingston (December 11, 1811 – February 22, 1891), a member of the Livingston family, was a prominent businessman from New York.

== Early life ==
Livingston was born on December 11, 1811, in New York City. He was the son of Maturin Livingston (1769–1847), a former Recorder of New York City, and Margaret (née Lewis) Livingston (1780–1860). His parents had twelve children, including: Morgan Lewis Livingston, Gertrude Laura Livingston, Julia Livingston, Alfred Livingston, Mortimer Livingston, Susan Mary Livingston, Maturin Livingston Jr., Henry Beekman Livingston, Angelica Livingston, and Blanche Geraldine Livingston. His younger sister Angelica married Alexander Hamilton Jr., the son of acting Secretary of State James Alexander Hamilton and grandson of Alexander Hamilton, the first Secretary of the Treasury.

His mother was the only daughter and sole heiress of New York Gov. Morgan Lewis and Gertrude (née Livingston) Lewis. His maternal grandmother, Gertrude, was the daughter of Judge Robert Livingston and Margaret Beekman Livingston, and the sister of Chancellor Robert R. Livingston. His father inherited his maternal grandfather's estate, the Staatsburgh House in Staatsburg, Dutchess County, upon the death of his father-in-law in 1844.

His paternal grandparents were Robert James Livingston and Susanna (née Smith) Livingston, herself the daughter of Chief Justice William Smith. His uncle was Peter R. Livingston and all of his Livingston family members were descended from Robert Livingston the Younger, through the Younger's eldest son, James Livingston.

== Career ==
After graduating from Yale University where he studied civil engineering, he went to work for the United States Coast Survey, and was in the expedition that first triangulated the entire coast.

After retiring from the Service and subsequent to his 1832 marriage, he went into business on Wall Street, becoming a member of the firm, Christmas, Prime, Livingston, & Costa. The business failed 10 years later, and he retired to his country place near New Brunswick, New Jersey. In 1860, he returned to New York.

=== Philanthropy ===
Livingston was one of the founders of the Children's Aid Society in 1853, and served as one of its first directors. He was also one of the founders of the Home for Incurables and at the time of his death, one of the longest serving members of the New York Hospital, where he was President of the Board of Governors.

== Personal life ==
In 1832, he was married to Louisa Matilda Storm (1810–1883), daughter of Garrit Storm (1778–1851) and Laura Gouverneur (1778–1835), who was born in Sint Eustatius, Dutch West Indies. Together, the couple had two children:

- Warren Livingston (1835–1857), who died unmarried
- Louise Matilda Livingston (1836–1920), who married Elbridge Thomas Gerry (1837–1927), grandson of the 5th U.S. Vice President Elbridge Gerry, in 1867.

He was a member of the Union Club, the Knickerbocker Club, and the Century Club of New York, and considered himself a War Democrat, although he never held political office.

Livingston died of pneumonia at his residence 10 East 48th Street, in New York City, and was buried at the family vault at St. James Church in Hyde Park, New York. He left his entire estate, which included real estate in Delaware, New York, his house on East 48th Street near Fifth Avenue, his stable at 19 East 52nd Street, also near Fifth Avenue, and his farm in Raritan, New Jersey, to his daughter.

=== Descendants ===
He was the grandfather of Robert Livingston Gerry Sr. (1877–1957) and Peter Goelet Gerry (1879–1957), a U.S. Representative and Senator from Rhode Island.
