= Elizabeth Livingston Cavendish-Bentinck =

- Born: Elizabeth Livingston; August 12, 1855; Newport, Rhode Island, U.S.
- Died: November 4, 1943 (aged 88); London, England
- Spouse: George Cavendish-Bentinck (m. 1880; died 1909)
- Children: 2
- Parents: Maturin Livingston Jr. (father); Ruth Baylies (mother)
- Relatives: Maturin Livingston (grandfather); Venetia James (sister-in-law); Ogden Mills (brother-in-law)

Elizabeth Cavendish-Bentinck (née Livingston; August 12, 1855 – November 4, 1943) was an American born member of the Livingston family who married a British Member of Parliament from the Cavendish-Bentinck family and was a prominent member of New York Society during the Gilded Age.

== Early life ==
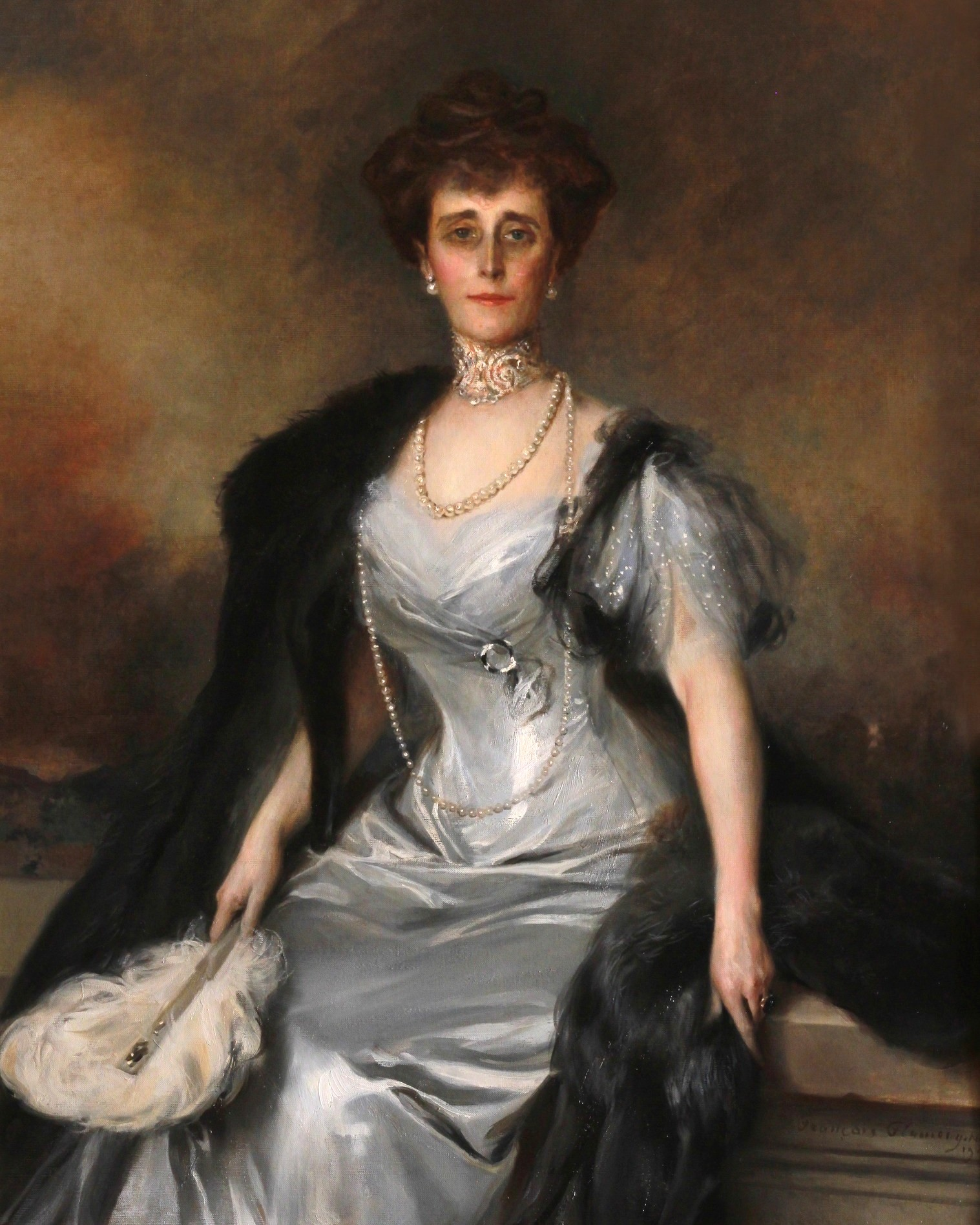
Elizabeth's twin sister, Ruth, by Francois Flemeng

Elizabeth was born in Newport, Rhode Island, on August 12, 1855. She was the daughter of Ruth Baylies (1817–1918) and Maturin Livingston Jr. (1815–1888). Her parents lived at the former home of her paternal grandfather, Maturin Livingston (1769–1847), a prominent lawyer and politician from New York, in Staatsburg, New York. Elizabeth had a twin sister, Ruth T. Livingston (1855–1920), who was the wife of Ogden Mills (1856–1929), and the mother of Ogden Livingston Mills, the United States Secretary of the Treasury.

== Society life ==
In 1899, Elizabeth’s cousin, Louisa Matilda Livingston, who was married to Elbridge T. Gerry, the grandson of U.S. Vice President Elbridge Gerry, gave a reception and dance in honor of their eldest daughter, Mary, in advance of her presentation the following spring at the Court of St. James and subsequent debut in London Society. The event was also the debut of Gerry's son, Peter Robert Goelet Gerry (1879–1957).

In 1904, while renting Highcliffe Castle, the Cavendish-Bentinck's were host to King Edward VII in Christchurch.

Elizabeth was included on Ward McAllister's list of New York's social elite during the Gilded Age, known as "Four Hundred", purported to be an index of New York's best families, published in The New York Times. She was known for being one of the many well-known transatlantic marriages between American heiresses and members of the British Peerage.

== Personal life ==
On August 12, 1880, Elizabeth married William George Cavendish-Bentinck (1854–1909), the son of George Cavendish-Bentinck (1821–1891) and Prudentia Penelope Leslie (d. 1896), the daughter of Col. Charles Powell Leslie (1769–1831). William’s father, a British barrister and cricketer was also a Conservative member of parliament from 1859 to 1891, and the only son of Major-General Lord Frederick Cavendish-Bentinck (1781–1828), the fourth son of Prime Minister William Cavendish-Bentinck, 3rd Duke of Portland (1738–1809). Together, they had:

- Mary Augusta Cavendish-Bentinck (1881–1913), who married John Gorman Ford (1866–1917), the 1st Secretary of the British Legation to Rome, son of diplomat Clare Ford, on November 3, 1906.
- Ruth Evelyn Cavendish-Bentinck (1883–1978), who married Walter Spencer Morgan Burns (1872–1929), nephew of J. P. Morgan and grandson of Junius Spencer Morgan, both well-known American bankers, in 1907.

In 1909, her husband died at age 55, at Forest Farm, Windsor, Berkshire. In 1914, she had a family mausoleum built in the Churchyard of St Giles in Hertfordshire, designed by Robert Weir Schultz. Elizabeth died on November 4, 1943, in London.
