= Francis Lewis =

Founding Father (1713–1802)

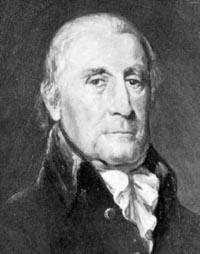
- Born: March 21, 1713; Llandaff, Wales
- Died: December 31, 1802 (aged 89); New York City, U.S.
- Resting place: Trinity Church Cemetery
- Education: Westminster School
- Occupations: Merchant; politician
- Known for: Signer of the United States Declaration of Independence
- Spouse: Elizabeth Annesley (m. 1745; died 1778)
- Children: 7, including Morgan

Signature
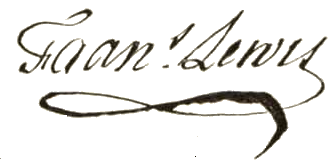

Francis Lewis (March 21, 1713 – December 31, 1802) was an American merchant and a Founding Father of the United States. He was a signatory of the United States Declaration of Independence and Articles of Confederation as a representative of New York in the Continental Congress.

== Early life ==
Lewis was born in Llandaff, Wales, on March 21, 1713. He was the son of Morgan Lewis and Anne Lewis (née Pettingale) of Newport. Lewis was educated at Westminster School in London.

== Career ==
Lewis entered a mercantile house in London until he turned 21 and inherited some properties left by his father. Lewis sold the properties and used the proceeds to acquire merchandise, set sail for New York City, arriving there in about 1737. He left some of the goods in New York to be sold by Edward Annesley, his business partner, and brought the rest to Philadelphia. After two years in Philadelphia, he returned to New York.

Lewis made several trans-Atlantic trips, visiting several northern European ports, Saint Petersburg, northern Scotland, and Africa. He was taken prisoner while he served as a British mercantile agent in 1756 and sent to France for imprisonment. On his release and his return home, he became active in politics.

Lewis was a member of the Committee of Sixty, a member of the New York Provincial Congress, and a delegate to the Continental Congress from 1775 to 1779. In 1776 he signed the United States Declaration of Independence, and in 1778 he signed the United States Articles of Confederation. In 1779, he served as the chairman of the Continental Board of Admiralty.

He helped his son Francis Lewis Jr. open a dry goods business named Francis Lewis and Son. His son Morgan served in the Continental Army during the Revolutionary War and later held many offices in New York State, including governor.

== Personal life ==
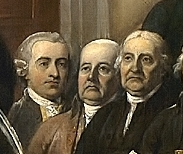
Richard Stockton, Francis Lewis and John Witherspoon in the background of John Trumbull's painting Declaration of Independence (1819)

In 1745, Lewis married to Elizabeth Annesley (died 1779), a sister of his business partner, Thomas Annesley. Together, they were the parents of seven children, three of whom survived to adulthood:

- Ann Lewis (1748–1802), who married Captain George Robertson (1742–1791) of the Royal Navy.
- Francis Lewis Jr. (1749–1814), who served as churchwarden of St George's Parish in Flushing, New York, from 1791 to 1794. He married Elizabeth Ludlow (d. 1831), daughter of Gabriel Ludlow, Esq.
- Morgan Lewis (1754–1844), who married Gertrude Livingston, the daughter of Judge Robert Livingston of Clermont. He was a governor and attorney general of New York.

In 1775, Lewis acquired and relocated his family to an estate located in Whitestone, in present-day Queens. The home was later destroyed after the Battle of Long Island by British forces, who also arrested his wife Elizabeth. She was eventually released in a prisoner exchange for the wives of two wealthy Loyalists from Philadelphia, though the hardships Elizabeth endured in captivity ruined her health and led to her death in 1779.

Through his eldest surviving daughter Ann, he was a grandfather to Marianne Robertson (1779–1829), who married John Bird Sumner, the Archbishop of Canterbury and brother of Charles Richard Sumner, bishop of Winchester. Through his son Morgan, he was a grandfather of Margret Lewis (1780–1860), who married New York lawyer and politician Maturin Livingston and became parents to twelve children. Through his son Francis Jr., he was a grandfather of Gabriel Ludlow Lewis.

== Death and legacy ==
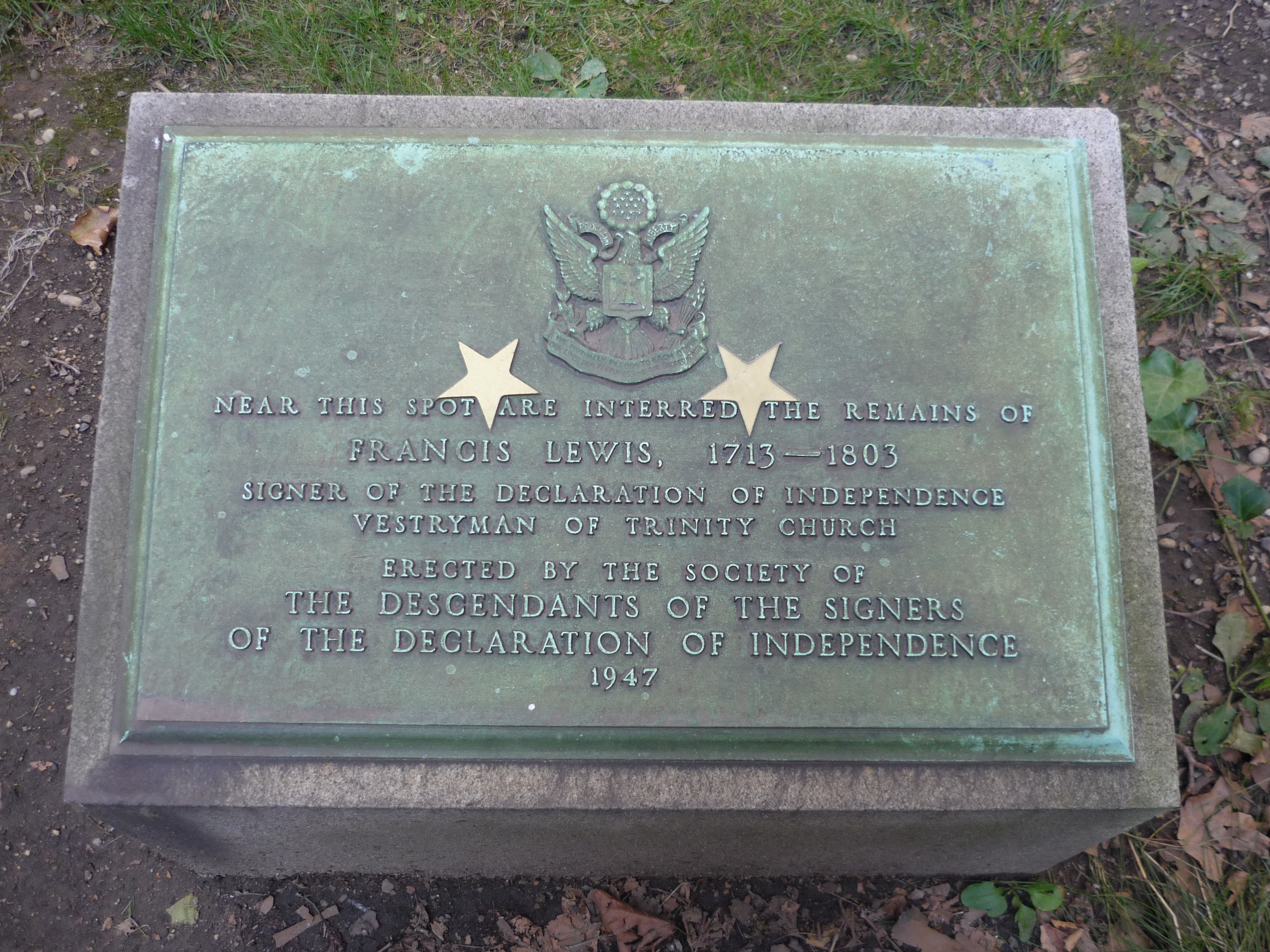
Memorial to Francis Lewis at Trinity Church Cemetery, New York City.

Lewis died on December 31, 1802, although his memorial in Trinity Church Cemetery gives his year of death as 1803.

In Queens, New York, Francis Lewis High School and P.S. 79 "The Francis Lewis School" are named after Lewis. Francis Lewis Boulevard, which locals sometimes refer to as "Franny Lew" or "Franny Lewie," stretches almost the entire north–south length of the borough. Francis Lewis Park is located under the Queens approach of the Bronx–Whitestone Bridge. A society of the Children of the American Revolution located in Queens, NY, is named for him. A masonic lodge, Francis Lewis #273, is located in Whitestone.

== See also ==
- Memorial to the 56 Signers of the Declaration of Independence
