= Pierre C. Van Wyck =

American lawyer

Pierre Van Cortlandt Van Wyck (c. 1778 – April 4, 1827 in New York City) was an American lawyer and politician from New York.

== Life ==
He was the son of Abraham Van Wyck (1738–1786) and Catherine (Van Cortlandt) Van Wyck (1751–1829; daughter of Lt. Gov. Pierre Van Cortlandt). After the death of her husband, Catherine went to live with her children at the Van Cortlandt Manor in Croton-on-Hudson, the residence of her brother Philip Van Cortlandt.

Pierre Van Wyck graduated from Columbia College in 1795. Then he studied law, was admitted to the bar, and practiced in the courts of Westchester County.

As a member of the Clintonian faction of the Democratic-Republican Party, he was Recorder of New York City from 1806 to 1807, from 1808 to 1810, and from 1811 to 1813.

He was New York County District Attorney from 1818 to 1821. On August 26, 1819, he married Alice Young. He was an Assistant Alderman from the Third Ward for the term 1825–26.

== Sources ==
- The New York Civil List compiled by Franklin Benjamin Hough (pages 377 and 428; Weed, Parsons and Co., 1858)
- The History of Political Parties in the State of New-York, from the Ratification of the Federal Constitution to 1840 by Jabez D. Hammond (pages 234 and 238; 4th ed., Vol. 1, H. & E. Phinney, Cooperstown, 1846)
- The Croakers by Joseph Rodman Drake & Fitz-Greene Halleck (page 171)
- Livingston Family tree [gives wrong death year "1842"]
- The Ladies' Literary Cabinet edited by Samuel Woodworth (marriage notice on page 136; issue of September 4, 1819)
- American Masonic Record, and Albany Saturday Magazine (death notice on page 78; issue of April 7, 1827)
- Historical Index to the Manuals of the Corporation of the City of New York (page 236)

Legal offices
Preceded by Maturin Livingston	Recorder of New York City; 1806–1807	Succeeded by Maturin Livingston
Preceded by Maturin Livingston	Recorder of New York City; 1808–1810	Succeeded by Josiah Ogden Hoffman
Preceded by Josiah Ogden Hoffman	Recorder of New York City; 1811–1813	Succeeded by Josiah Ogden Hoffman
Preceded by Hugh Maxwell	New York County District Attorney; 1818–1821	Succeeded by Hugh Maxwell
