= Alexander Hamilton Jr. (1816–1889) =

American lawyer

Alexander Hamilton
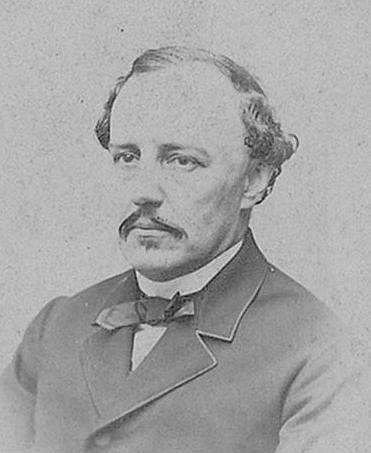
- Hamilton in December 1863

Secretary of the United States Legation at Madrid
- In office 1848–1850

Personal details
- Born: January 26, 1816 New York City, U.S.
- Died: December 30, 1889 (aged 73) New York City, U.S.
- Spouse: Angelica Livingston (m. 1840)
- Children: 1 son
- Parents: James Alexander Hamilton; Mary Morris
- Relatives: See Hamilton family
- Education: United States Military Academy
- Occupation: Lawyer
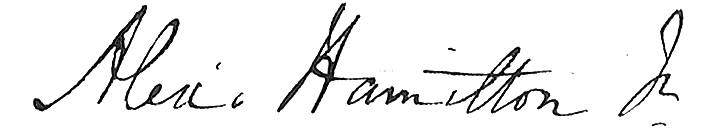
- Signature

Alexander Hamilton II (January 26, 1816 – December 30, 1889), was the son of James Alexander Hamilton, and the grandson of Alexander Hamilton, one of the Founding Fathers of the United States.

== Early life ==
Hamilton was born on January 26, 1816, in New York City. He was the third of five children, and the only son, born to James Alexander Hamilton (1788–1878) and Mary Morris, the daughter of Robert Morris and Frances Ludlum and the sister of Lewis Gouverneur Morris (1808–1900).

His paternal grandparents were Alexander Hamilton (1755–1804), the first Secretary of the Treasury, and Eliza Schuyler (1757–1854). His grandmother was the second daughter of Philip Schuyler, a Revolutionary War general, and Catherine Van Rensselaer, of the Van Rensselaers of the Manor of Rensselaerswyck, one of the richest and most politically influential families in the state of New York.

Hamilton attended the United States Military Academy at West Point from July 1832 to June 1835.

== Career ==
Hamilton became a lawyer in New York City, and was a founding partner in the law firm of Hamilton and Lyon. From June 1842 to April 1844, he was the Secretary of the United States Legation at Madrid, serving under Washington Irving. He retired from the practice of law in 1870.

=== U.S. Civil War ===
In April 1861, during the American Civil War, Hamilton was appointed a volunteer aide-de-camp to General John E. Wool, who commanded the U.S. Army's Department of the East in New York. On August 28, 1861, he was given an official position as Wool's additional aide-de-camp, and served in that capacity until he resigned on December 11, 1861. In July 1863, during the New York City draft riots, he again assisted Wool, who reported to Governor Seymour that his "former aid[e], Colonel Alexander Hamilton Jr. ... volunteered especially for this occasion, and [was] constantly in attendance day and night."

Hamilton wrote to President Lincoln in a letter dated May 26, 1862, calling Secretary of War Edwin Stanton's division of General George McClellan's Army of the Potomac into four separate departments "the grossest mismanagement."

== Personal life ==
In 1845, after his return from Spain, he married Angelica Livingston (1820–1896), the daughter of Maturin Livingston (1769–1847). Angelica's mother was Margaret (née Lewis) Livingston (1780–1860), the only daughter and sole heiress of Gov. Morgan Lewis (1754–1844). They had one son, Alexander, born in 1848, who died at the age of 11 months.

Hamilton was a founding member, and the first president, of New York's Knickerbocker Club when it was organized in 1871. He was also a founder of the Union League Club.
