= Hugh Maxwell =

American politician

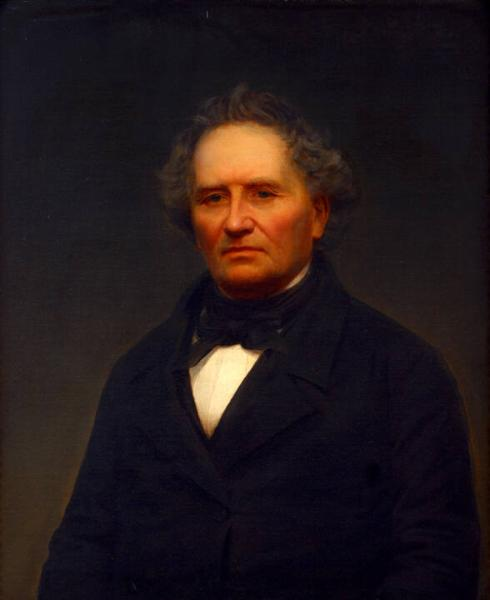

Collector of the Port of New York
- In office 1849–1853
- President: Zachary Taylor; Millard Fillmore
- Preceded by: Cornelius W. Lawrence
- Succeeded by: Greene C. Bronson

New York County District Attorney
- In office 1821–1829
- Preceded by: Pierre C. Van Wyck
- Succeeded by: Ogden Hoffman
- In office 1817–1818
- Preceded by: John Rodman
- Succeeded by: Pierre C. Van Wyck

Personal details
- Born: 1787 Paisley, Scotland
- Died: March 31, 1873 (aged 85–86) New York City, U.S.
- Party: Whig
- Spouse: Agnes Stevenson
- Children: 4
- Parent: William Maxwell
- Education: Columbia College

Hugh Maxwell (1787 – March 31, 1873) was an American lawyer and politician from New York.

== Early life ==
Maxwell was born in Paisley, Scotland in 1787. He was the son of William Maxwell.

After immigrating to the United States in 1790 around the age of three, he graduated from Columbia College in 1808 where he was classmates and close friends with Gulian C. Verplanck, later a New York State Senator and member of the U.S. House of Representatives. At Columbia, Hugh Maxwell was a member of the Philolexian Society.

== Career ==
After graduating from Columbia, he studied law and was admitted to the bar and built up a lucrative practice. In 1814, during the War of 1812, he was appointed Assistant Judge Advocate General of the U.S. Army.

=== New York County District Attorney ===
From 1817 to 1818 and again from 1821 to 1829, he was New York County District Attorney. On September 15, 1826, Jacob Barker, Henry Eckford, and other leaders of Tammany Hall were indicted for allegedly committing millions of dollars in acts of fraud against banks, insurance companies, and private citizens, and Maxwell subsequently prosecuted them for "conspiracy to defraud." The first trial ended in a hung jury in October 1826, although some defendants were convicted in a second trial. Eckford, a famous shipbuilder and entrepreneur of the time, was not prosecuted again after the first trial and sought an apology and public statement of his innocence from Maxwell, but succeeded only in getting Maxwell to make a statement that Eckford had been duped by others into illegal acts. Eckford challenged Maxwell to a duel in December 1827, but Maxwell ignored him.

=== Collector of the Port of New York ===
After his term as New York County District Attorney ended in 1829, he resumed his law practice for the next twenty years, occupying a prominent position in the New York bar, along with his law partner, Ogden Hoffman.

An ardent Whig, in 1849, Maxwell was appointed by President Zachary Taylor as Collector of the Port of New York and remained in office through the Fillmore Administration until 1853, when his term expired. Afterwards he resumed the practice of law, but retired after a few years.

== Personal life ==
Maxwell was married to Agnes Stevenson (1796–1866), with whom he had four children: Hugh Maxwell, John Stevenson Maxwell (1847–1918), Ann Eliza Maxwell, and Agnes Maxwell.

He was a member of the New-York Historical Society and was elected a member of Saint Andrew's Society of the State of New York in 1811, serving as manager from 1826 to 1828, second vice-president from 1828 to 1832, first vice-president from 1832 to 1835, and as President from 1835 to 1837. He was known for his love of classic literature and he entertained friends, including Thurlow Weed, William C. Rhinelander (grandfather of T.J. Oakley Rhinelander) and James Lenox, at his library, considered one of the best private collections in New York.

Maxwell died on March 31, 1873, at his residence, 14 St. Marks Place in New York City. He was buried at Oak Hill Cemetery in Nyack, New York.

Legal offices
Preceded by John Rodman	New York County District Attorney; 1817–1818	Succeeded by Pierre C. Van Wyck
Preceded by Pierre C. Van Wyck	New York County District Attorney; 1821–1829	Succeeded by Ogden Hoffman
Government offices
Preceded by Cornelius W. Lawrence	Collector of the Port of New York; 1849–1853	Succeeded by Greene C. Bronson
