= John Rodman =

American lawyer and politician (1775–1847)

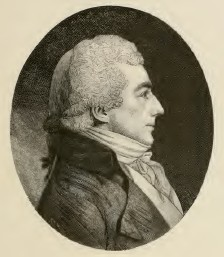
- Born: 1775
- Died: February 1847; New Brunswick
- Occupation: Lawyer

John Rodman (1775 – February 1847 in New Brunswick, New Jersey) was an American lawyer and politician from New York and Florida.

== Life ==
He married Harriet Fenno, daughter of John Fenno. Harriet Rodman died in 1808, and was buried in Trinity Churchyard. Their only child was Anna Eliza Rodman (ca. 1801–1881) who married Major General Harvey Brown.

During the War of 1812, he was a major of artillery.

In 1814, he published in New York his translation of the Commercial Code of France. He was New York County District Attorney from 1815 to 1817.

In May 1821, expecting the cessation of Florida by the Adams–Onís Treaty to take effect in July, Rodman was appointed by President James Monroe the first Collector of the Port of St. Augustine. Rodman was re-appointed several times, and remained in office until 1842. During his tenure as Collector, he also held other local offices (at times acting as Mayor), and practiced law in the local courts.

North Carolina Supreme Court Justice William B. Rodman was his nephew.

== Sources ==
- The New York Civil List compiled by Franklin Benjamin Hough (page 369; Weed, Parsons and Co., 1858)
- Niles' Register (issue of June 2, 1821)
- Genealogy of the Rodman Family 1620-1886 by Charles Henry Jones (p. 53ff) [states erroneously that he was U.S. District Attorney of the Southern D. of NY]

Legal offices
| Preceded by Barent Gardenier | New York County District Attorney; 1815–1817 | Succeeded by Hugh Maxwell |
