= 1804 New York gubernatorial election =

- April 1804
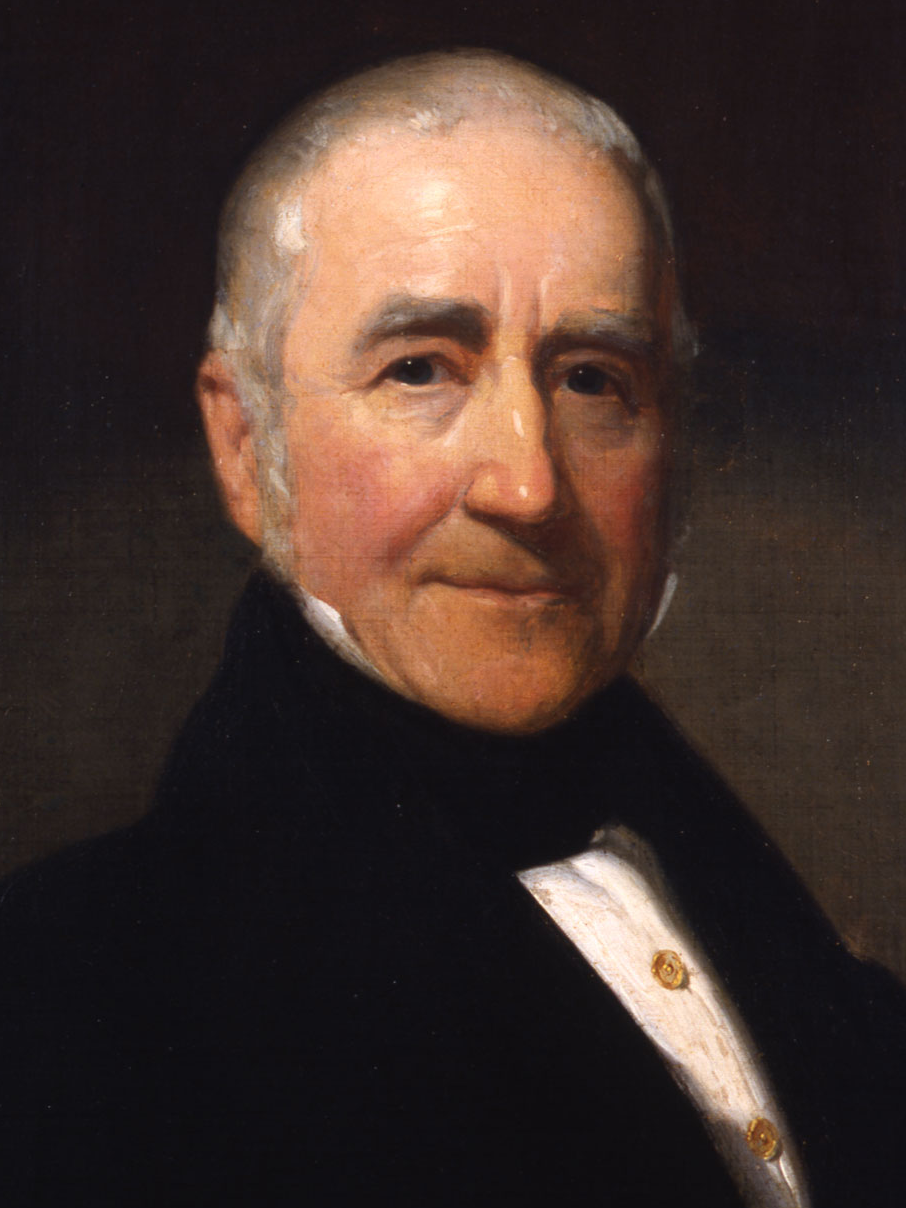

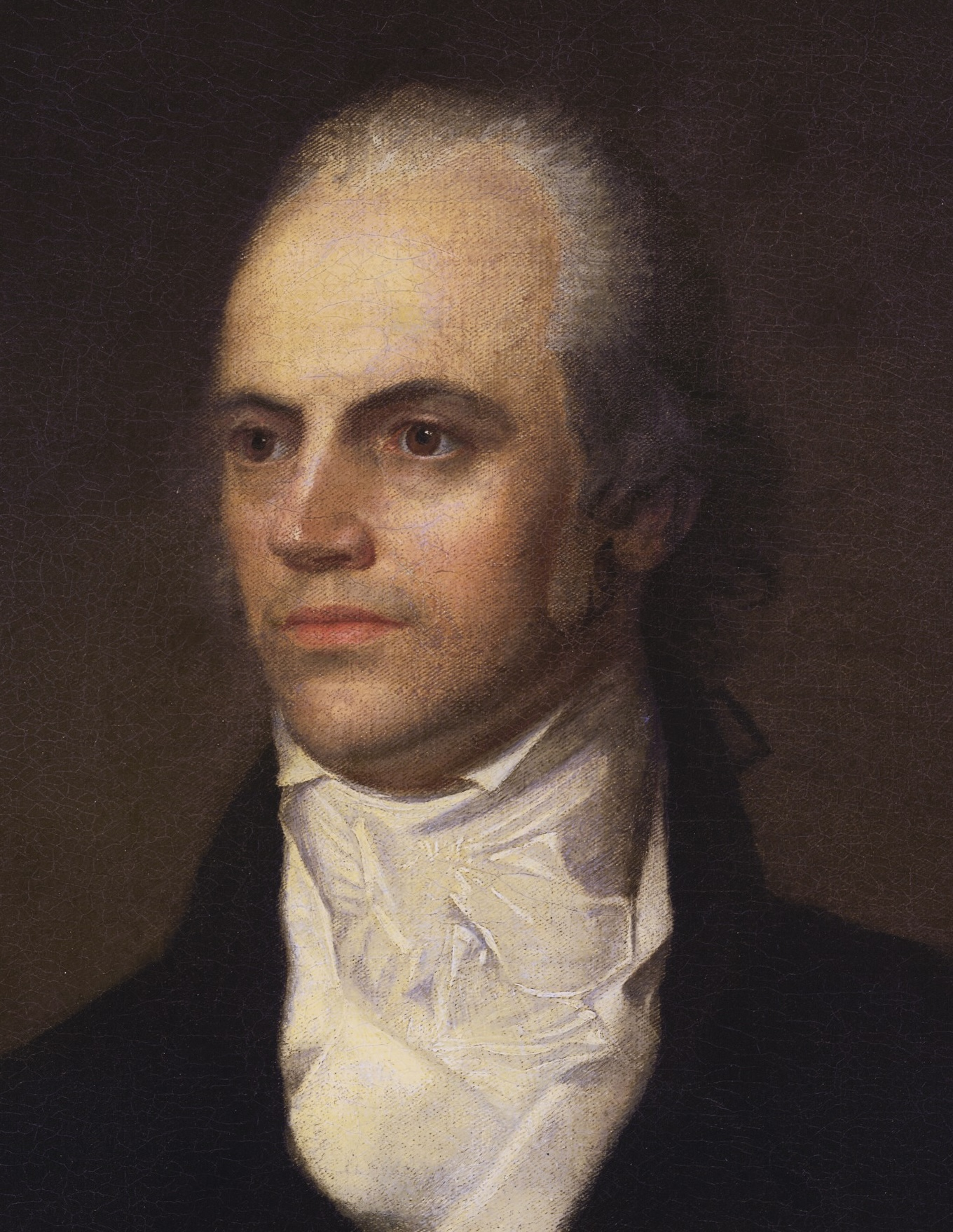
Nominee	Morgan Lewis	Aaron Burr
Party	Democratic-Republican	Democratic-Republican
Alliance		Tammany Hall; Federalist
Popular vote	30,829	22,139
Percentage	58.20%	41.80%
- County results Lewis: 50–60% 60–70% 70–80% 80–90% Burr: 50–60% No Data/Vote
Governor before election
George Clinton
Democratic-Republican
Elected Governor
Morgan Lewis
Democratic-Republican

The 1804 New York gubernatorial election was held in April 1804 to elect the Governor of New York. Incumbent Governor George Clinton did not run for re-election, having been nominated for Vice President of the United States in February. In a campaign that blurred partisan divisions, Morgan Lewis defeated Aaron Burr by a landslide margin.

Burr, the incumbent vice president, had been alienated from the Democratic-Republican Party after he challenged Thomas Jefferson in the contested presidential election of 1800. Though the ascendant Tammany Hall organization and some members of the Federalist Party supported Burr, he was opposed by the bulk of the Republicans, led by the Clinton and Livingston families. Alexander Hamilton, the most eminent Federalist, also refused to support his personal rival and endorsed Lewis. Hamilton's longstanding and severe criticisms of Burr, which were published during the campaign, led Burr to challenge him to the duel that killed Hamilton in July 1804.

== Background ==
In the 1800 United States presidential election, Aaron Burr ran on the Republican ticket as the running mate of Thomas Jefferson against incumbent President John Adams of the Federalist Party. At the time, the Constitution gave each elector two votes for president, and the candidate who received the second most votes became vice president. The Republican Party planned to have 72 of their 73 electors vote for both Jefferson and Burr, with the remaining elector voting only for Jefferson. However, the electors failed to execute this plan, so Burr and Jefferson tied with 73 votes each. The Constitution stipulated that if two candidates with an Electoral College majority were tied, a contingent election would be held in the House of Representatives, with each state casting one vote. At the time, the majority of House delegations were controlled by the Federalists, many of whom were loath to vote for their rival Jefferson over the more moderate Burr. Although Hamilton had a long-standing political rivalry with Jefferson stemming from their tenure as members of George Washington's cabinet, he regarded Burr as more dangerous and used all his influence to ensure Jefferson's election. On the 36th ballot, the House of Representatives gave Jefferson the presidency, with Burr becoming vice president.

Burr's conduct during the contingent election alienated him permanently from Jefferson and the majority of Republicans, and he returned his focus to state politics, where he engaged in a vicious struggle over political appointments with the Governor's nephew, DeWitt Clinton. At the 1801 constitutional convention, Clinton won a major victory by cementing the exclusive power of the Council of Appointment to nominate and appoint officeholders. Clinton, who dominated the council, refused to appoint any Burr allies to office. The political struggle led to mutual recriminations and a duel between Clinton and John Swartwout, in which the latter was shot twice in the leg. In 1802, DeWitt Clinton was elected to the United States Senate; he resigned the next year to become mayor of New York City. As the Clinton family became more dominant among the Republicans, Burr grew closer to the Federalist Party and cultivated their support. Clinton also succeeded in removing Burr and Swartwout from the board of the Manhattan Company in favor of Brockholst Livingston.

As it became clear that Jefferson would drop Burr from his ticket in the 1804 election, Burr chose to run for Governor of New York instead. As Burr's future within the Republican faction faded, New York governor George Clinton rose to fill the power vacuum. In February 1804, acknowledging the need for a northern running mate, the Republican caucus in Congress nominated Clinton for vice president over John Breckenridge of Kentucky.

== General election ==
=== Candidates ===
- Aaron Burr, Vice President of the United States
- Morgan Lewis, former Attorney General of New York and justice of the New York Supreme Court

==== Declined ====
- George Clinton, incumbent Governor since 1801 (Note: Clinton had previously served as governor from 1777–1795.) (ran for Vice President of the United States)
- De Witt Clinton, mayor of New York City
- John Lansing Jr., Chancellor of New York
- Ambrose Spencer, Attorney General of New York

John Lansing Jr. was initially nominated by the Republican caucus in the legislature but declined the nomination on February 18.

On the same day, a cross-party meeting was held for supporters of Aaron Burr, who nominated him for Governor. On February 20, a public meeting was held to approve Burr's nomination in New York City. A second meeting was held in Albany to ratify the nomination.

Morgan Lewis, Chief Justice of the Supreme Court, was eventually chosen to replace Lansing, and he was supported by 104 of the 132 members of the Legislature.

=== Campaign ===
The 1804 campaign was among the most vicious in New York history. The Republicans questioned Burr's private life, while Burr supporters accused the Livingston and Clinton families of packing state offices with relatives.

Alexander Hamilton, whose support of Jefferson in 1801 had been crucial in blocking Burr from the presidency, refused to join the majority of Federalists in supporting Burr. During the campaign, private attacks by Hamilton on Burr's character were made public.

=== Results ===
Lewis defeated Burr by the widest margin in New York history to that point.

1804 New York gubernatorial election
Party	Candidate	Votes	%
Democratic-Republican	Morgan Lewis	30,829	58.20%
Democratic-Republican	Aaron Burr	22,139	41.80%
Total votes		52,968	100.00%

== Aftermath ==
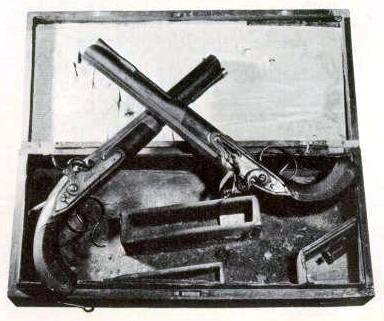
These pistols were used in the infamous Burr-Hamilton duel. Burr killed former U.S. Secretary of the Treasury Alexander Hamilton and entered a period of political exile, ending the careers of two of New York's most prominent politicians.

Blaming Hamilton for his defeats in both 1801 and 1804, Burr charged Hamilton with a smear campaign through the intentional dissemination of his private comments. Hamilton refused to acknowledge the accusation, but accepted when Burr challenged him to a duel. On July 11, 1804, Burr and Hamilton met in Weehawken, New Jersey; when the signal was given, Burr shot instantly, striking Hamilton in the chest. He died thirty-one hours later.

Hamilton's death ended Burr's political future in New York and weakened the already-waning Federalist Party. Burr left New York for the American West but was arrested in 1807 on charges of treason for his involvement in an alleged plot to lead a secessionist movement. After his acquittal, Burr entered a self-imposed exile to Europe before returning to New York City to live out his life as an attorney. With Hamilton dead and Burr sidelined, the Clinton and Livingston families expected uncontested control of state politics after 1804.

== See also ==
- New York gubernatorial elections
- New York state elections
