= George Cavendish-Bentinck =

British barrister, Conservative politician and cricketer

The Right Honourable George Cavendish-Bentinck PC JP
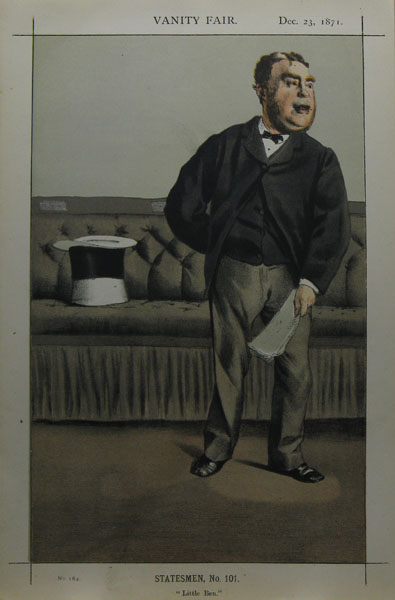
- "Little Ben" as caricatured by James Tissot in Vanity Fair, December 1871

Member of Parliament for Whitehaven
- In office 1865–1891
- Preceded by: George Lyall
- Succeeded by: Sir James Bain

Judge Advocate General
- In office 1875–1880
- Monarch: Victoria
- Prime Minister: Benjamin Disraeli
- Preceded by: Stephen Cave
- Succeeded by: George Osborne Morgan

Parliamentary Secretary to the Board of Trade
- In office 1874–1875
- Monarch: Victoria
- Prime Minister: Benjamin Disraeli
- Preceded by: Viscount Peel
- Succeeded by: Edward Stanhope

Member of Parliament for Taunton
- In office 1859 – 1865 (with Arthur Mills)
- Preceded by: Baron Taunton; Arthur Mills
- Succeeded by: Alexander Charles Barclay; The Marquess of Tweeddale

Personal details
- Born: George Augustus Frederick Cavendish-Bentinck; 9 July 1821 Westminster, Middlesex
- Died: 9 April 1891 (aged 69) Brownsea Island, Dorset
- Party: Conservative
- Spouse: Prudentia Penelope Leslie (m. 1850)
- Children: 4, including William George, Christina Anne and Mary Venetia
- Parent(s): Lord Frederick Cavendish-Bentinck; Lady Mary Lowther
- Education: Westminster School
- Alma mater: Trinity College, Cambridge

George Augustus Frederick Cavendish-Bentinck PC JP (9 July 1821 – 9 April 1891), known as George Bentinck and scored in cricket as GAFC Bentinck, was a British barrister, Conservative politician, and cricketer. A member of parliament from 1859 to 1891, he served under Benjamin Disraeli as Parliamentary Secretary to the Board of Trade from 1874 to 1875 and as Judge Advocate General from 1875 to 1880.

In cricket, he batted for Marylebone Cricket Club in nine games between 1840 and 1846, as well as appearing once for the Cambridge University cricket team and again for a first-class Invitational XI match.

== Early life ==
Cavendish-Bentinck was born in Westminster, Middlesex, in 1821, the only son of Major-General Lord Frederick Cavendish-Bentinck (1781–1828), fourth son of Prime Minister William Cavendish-Bentinck, 3rd Duke of Portland (1738–1809). His mother was Mary Lowther (d. 1863), a daughter of William Lowther, 1st Earl of Lonsdale (1757–1844), a Tory politician who served as a Member of Parliament for Appleby, Carlisle, Cumberland, and Rutland.

He was educated at Westminster School and Trinity College, Cambridge. While at Westminster School, he played for the school's First XI cricket team and faced the MCC for the first time in June 1837, scoring 14 and 13, although his team was defeated by 49 runs, and for a second time in July 1839 when he opened the innings with scores of two and six.

== Career ==
In 1840, Cavendish-Bentinck was commissioned into the Grenadier Guards, but retired in 1841 after only a year. He joined the MCC to play against Oxford University on 11 June 1840 – his debut first-class match. Oxford, despite playing at home, fell to a heavy defeat as the MCC won by seven wickets. Cavendish-Bentinck made 11. His one appearance for Cambridge came in a match against the MCC, on 1 July 1841. Apart from various appearances for the MCC against school sides, Cavendish-Bentinck would play eight other first-class games for the MCC, scoring fifty-three runs in total, including a best of 29 not out. Add to this one match between two invitational teams – a Slow Bowlers XI featuring Bentinck versus a Fast Bowlers XI – and Cavendish-Bentinck played eleven games in total, scoring 66 runs at a low batting average of 5.50.

In 1846, he was called to the Bar from Lincoln's Inn and became an equity draftsman and conveyancer.

=== Political career ===
Cavendish-Bentinck stood unsuccessfully for the borough of Taunton at the general election April 1859, but was elected Member of Parliament (MP) for the borough at a by-election in August that year. He held the seat until the 1865 general election, when he was returned unopposed for Whitehaven. He held that seat until his death, aged 69, in 1891. He served in the second Conservative administration of Benjamin Disraeli as Parliamentary Secretary to the Board of Trade from 1874 to 1875 and as Judge Advocate General from 1875 to 1880. In 1875, he was sworn of the Privy Council.

Apart from his legal and political career, Cavendish-Bentinck was a Trustee of the British Museum from 1875 until his death and a Justice of the Peace for Cumberland and Dorset. In 1885, he was one of the staunchest adversaries of William Thomas Stead during the Eliza Armstrong case.

== Personal life ==
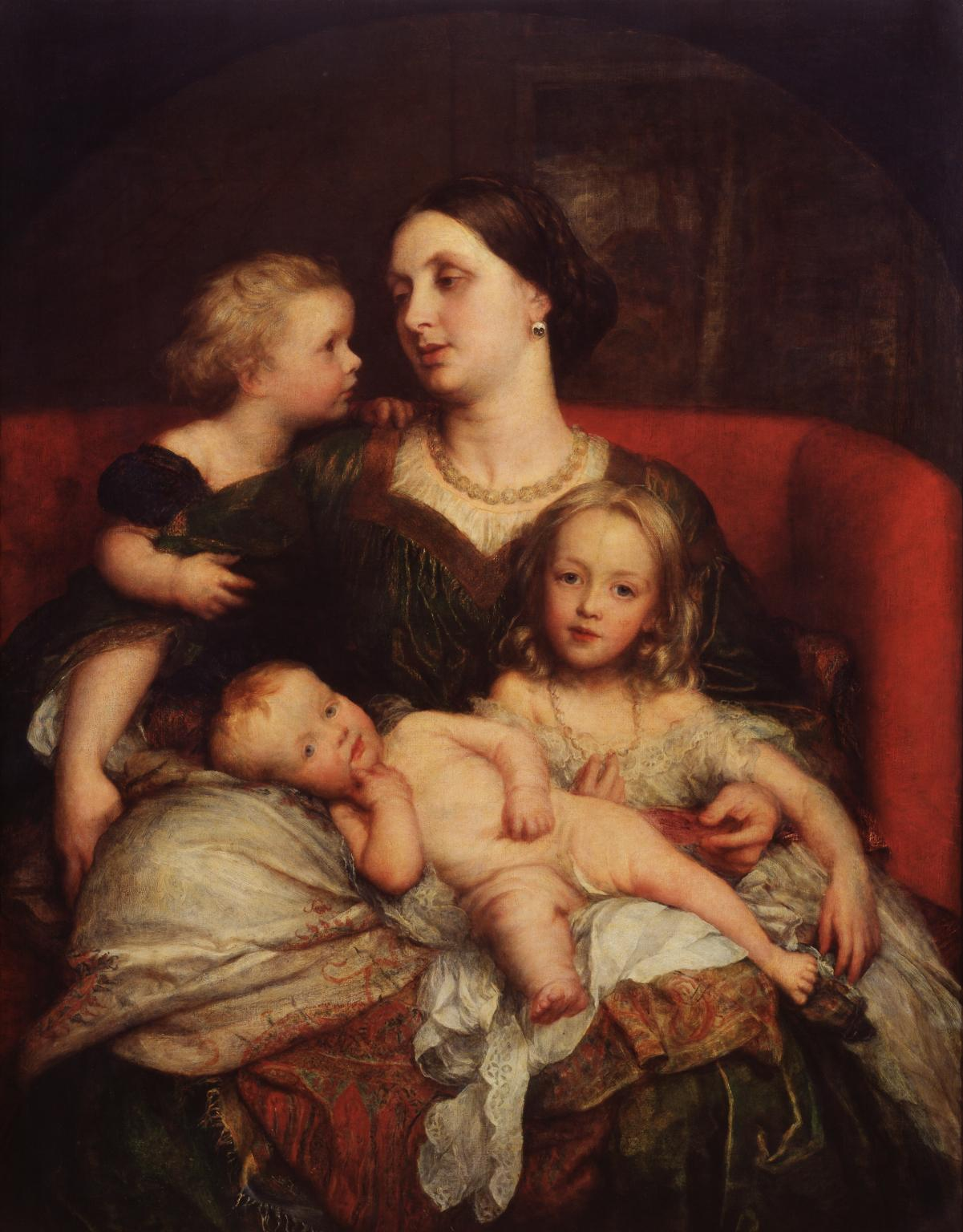
Painting of Mrs George Cavendish-Bentinck and her children, by George Frederic Watts

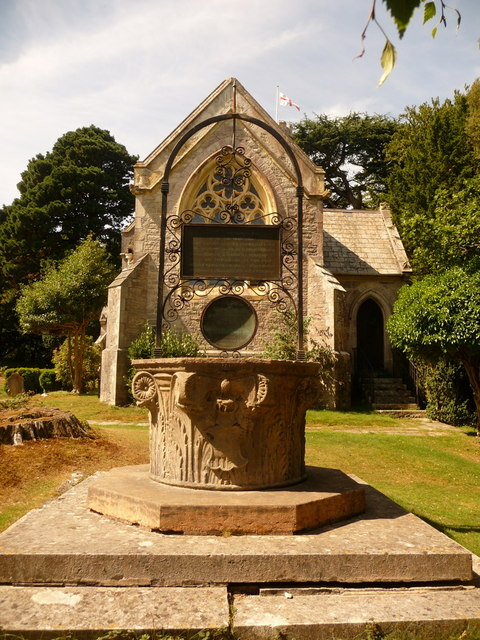
Grave of Cavendish-Bentinck on Brownsea Island

On 14 August 1850, Cavendish-Bentinck married Prudentia Penelope Leslie (d. 1896), the daughter of Col. Charles Powell Leslie. Together, they had two sons and two daughters:

- Christina Anne Jessica Cavendish-Bentinck (d. 1912), who married Sir Tatton Sykes, 5th Baronet, and was the mother of Sir Mark Sykes, 6th Baronet.
- William George Cavendish-Bentinck (1854–1909), who married Elizabeth Livingston, granddaughter of Maturin Livingston, in 1880.
- Frederick Cavendish-Bentinck (1856–1948), who married Ruth St Maur, and was father of the 8th and 9th Duke of Portland.
- Mary Venetia Cavendish-Bentinck (1861–1948), who married Arthur James, and was godmother to Queen Elizabeth (the Queen Mother).

In 1889, Cavendish-Bentinck was named by rentboy John Saul in his police statement as a client of the infamous male brothel at the heart of the Cleveland Street scandal.

Cavendish-Bentinck purchased Branksea Castle on Brownsea Island in 1873 and introduced Jersey cows and developed agriculture on the island. He died there in April 1891, aged 69. His wife survived him by five years and died in June 1896.

Parliament of the United Kingdom
Preceded by Henry Labouchere; Arthur Mills	Member of Parliament for Taunton; 1859–1865; With: Arthur Mills	Succeeded by Alexander Charles Barclay; Lord William Hay
Preceded by George Lyall	Member of Parliament for Whitehaven; 1865–1891	Succeeded by Sir James Bain
Political offices
Preceded by Arthur Wellesley Peel	Parliamentary Secretary to the Board of Trade; 1874–1875	Succeeded by Edward Stanhope
Preceded by Stephen Cave	Judge Advocate General; 1875–1880	Succeeded by George Osborne Morgan
