= Venetia James =

British society hostess and racehorse breeder

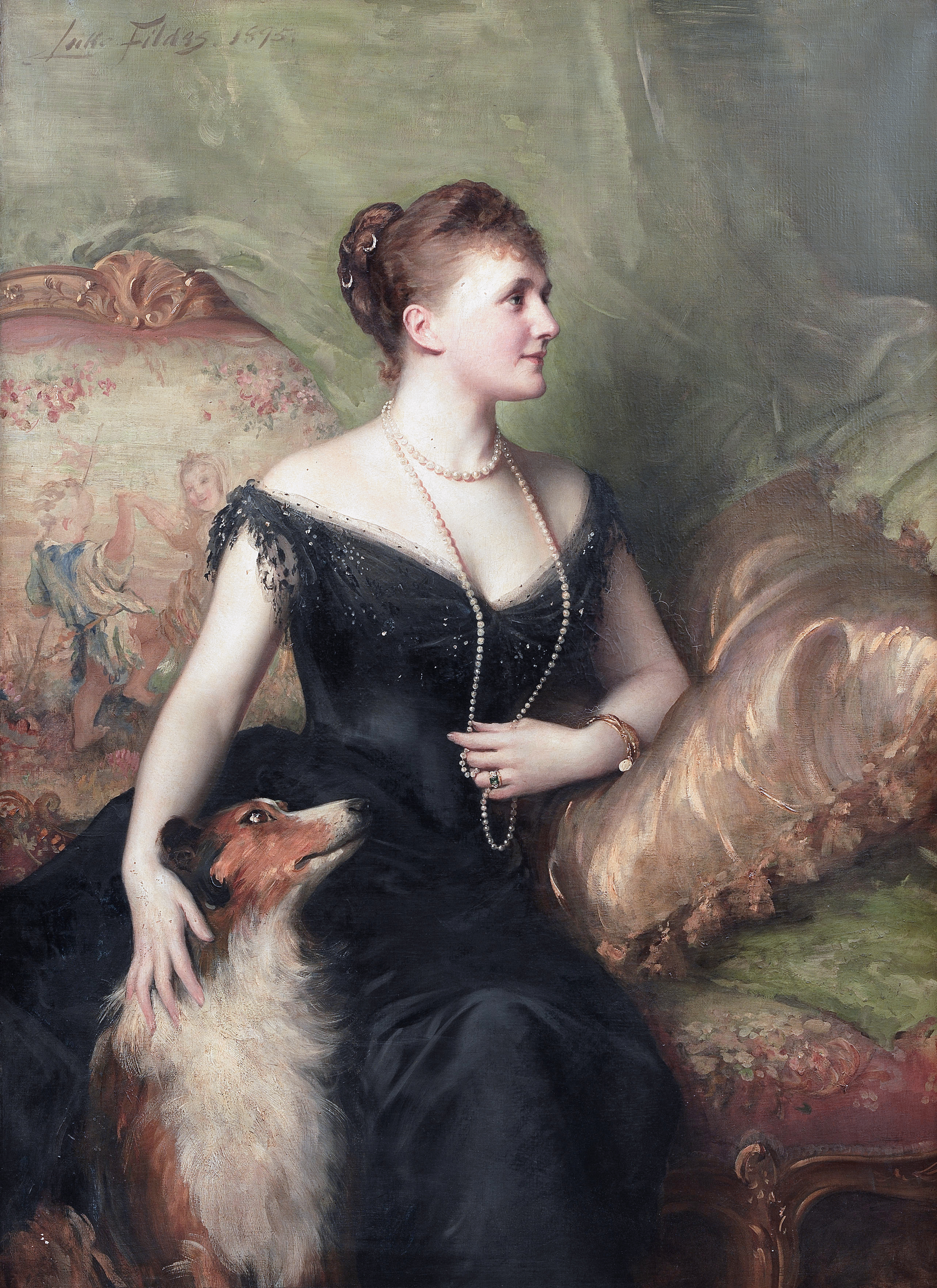
- Portrait by Luke Fildes, 1895
- Born: Mary Venetia Cavendish-Bentinck; 4 June 1861
- Died: 2 May 1948 (aged 86)
- Spouse: Arthur James (m. 1885)
- Parent(s): George Cavendish-Bentinck; Prudentia Penelope Leslie
- Relatives: Cavendish-Bentinck

Mary Venetia James (née Cavendish-Bentinck; 4 June 1861 – 2 May 1948) was a London society hostess and racehorse breeder.

== Early life ==
James was born into the Cavendish-Bentinck family, the daughter of Prudentia (née Leslie) and George Cavendish-Bentinck (1821–1891). Her brother was William George Cavendish-Bentinck (1854–1909), and they were related to the dukes of Portland, with the dukedom eventually passing to her nephews, Ferdinand and Victor; she was also a relative and godmother of Queen Elizabeth.

In 1872, the 11-year-old Mary Venetia Cavendish-Bentinck had been a bridesmaid at the wedding of Christina Nilsson, a famous opera singer of the period. The wedding was a high society affair, arranged by Venetia's father in Westminster Abbey, London. Venetia held the bride's bouquet whilst Nilsson took her vows with her future husband, French banker Auguste Rouzaud.

== Personal life ==
In December 1885, she married the racehorse owner and breeder Arthur James in the Chapel Royal, St James's, London. Venetia and her husband resided at Grafton Street, London, and bred horses at Coton House.

Venetia and Arthur James were both friends of King Edward VII, and Venetia was reputed to be his mistress. The King's private secretary, Frederick Ponsonby, wrote that she was "full of humour and high spirits, walking with the King and keeping him amused".

Despite being a millionaire, James was noted for her extreme frugality. She served her guests milk that her cat would not drink and preferred to host Catholics on Fridays because fish was cheaper than meat. She was widowed in 1917 and financed the construction of a new department of the Hospital of St Cross, Rugby, in memory of her husband, who had also donated to the hospital. She continued to breed horses and participate in races, winning the Victoria Cup and the 1932 Coronation Cup.

James died in 1948, without issue, leaving her jewellery and paintings by Titian, Joshua Reynolds and Thomas Gainsborough to her goddaughter, Queen Elizabeth.

== Horse racing ==
After the death of her husband in 1917, she continued her interests in the Coton House Stud. She was also a successful owner on the track with horses trained by the Hon. George Lampton and George Colling. These included Salmon Leap, Herbalist and Phalaros with wins in the Goodwood Cup, Coronation Cup, Portland Handicap and Victoria Cup.
