= William George Cavendish-Bentinck =

British politician (1854-1909)

George Cavendish-Bentinck

Member of Parliament for Penryn and Falmouth
- In office 1886–1895
- Preceded by: David James Jenkins
- Succeeded by: Frederick John Horniman

Personal details
- Born: William George Cavendish-Bentinck; 6 March 1854 London, England
- Died: 22 August 1909 (aged 55) Windsor, Berkshire
- Party: Conservative
- Spouse: Elizabeth Livingston (m. 1880)
- Children: 2
- Parents: George Augustus Frederick Cavendish-Bentinck; Prudentia Penelope Leslie
- Relatives: Mary Cavendish-Bentinck (sister); Charles Powell Leslie II (grandfather); Ferdinand Cavendish-Bentinck (nephew); Victor Cavendish-Bentinck (nephew); Ogden Mills (brother-in-law)
- Education: Marlborough College; Harrow School
- Alma mater: Cambridge University

William George Cavendish-Bentinck (6 March 1854 – 22 August 1909), known as George Cavendish-Bentinck, was a member of parliament for Penryn and Falmouth between 1886 and 1895, who married into the American Livingston family.

== Early life ==
Cavendish-Bentinck was born on 6 March 1854 to The Rt. Hon. George Augustus Frederick Cavendish-Bentinck (1821–1891) and Prudentia Penelope Leslie (d. 1896), the daughter of Col. Charles Powell Leslie II (1769–1831). His father, a British barrister, Conservative politician, and cricketer who was also a member of parliament from 1859 to 1891, was the only son of Major-General Lord Frederick Cavendish-Bentinck (1781–1828), who was the fourth son of Prime Minister William Cavendish-Bentinck, 3rd Duke of Portland (1738–1809), and brother to William Bentinck, 4th Duke of Portland (1768–1854).

He was educated in London at Marlborough and Harrow Schools, and at Jesus College, Cambridge; he graduated from the University of Cambridge with a Bachelor or Arts (1876) and Master of Arts (1879).

=== Family ===
His elder sister, Christina Anne Jessica Cavendish-Bentinck (d. 1912), was married to Sir Tatton Sykes, 5th Baronet (1826–1913), and was the mother of Sir Mark Sykes, 6th Baronet (1879–1919). His younger brother, William George Frederick Cavendish-Bentinck (1856–1948) was the father of the 8th Duke of Portland, and the 9th Duke of Portland. His younger sister, Mary Venetia Cavendish-Bentinck (1861–1948), was married to John Arthur James (1853–1917), and was godmother to Queen Elizabeth the Queen Mother.

Through his father, he was second cousins, thrice removed, to King Charles III.

== Career ==
Cavendish-Bentinck was private secretary to Henry Holland, 1st Viscount Knutsford (1825–1914), at the Colonial Office and to Frederick Stanley, 16th Earl of Derby (1841–1908) at the Board of Trade.

He was a Captain of the Dorsetshire Regiment, Justice of the Peace for Dorset, and a barrister-at-law.

In the general election of 1885, Cavendish-Bentinck ran for a seat in parliament during the but was unsuccessful, losing to David James Jenkins, a Liberal who received 52.3% of the vote. He ran again during the general election of 1886, and was elected a member of parliament for Penryn and Falmouth with 52.2% of the vote.

He won again in the general election of 1892, but lost to Liberal Frederick John Horniman in the general election of 1895.

=== Later career ===
In 1903, Cavendish-Bentinck travelled to Durbar by way of Egypt, visiting Cairo, Brindisi and Rome. He was also a Trustee of the British Museum.

In 1904, while renting Highcliffe Castle, the Cavendish-Bentincks were host to King Edward VII, in Christchurch.

== Personal life ==
On 12 August 1880, he married Elizabeth Livingston (1855–1943), daughter of Ruth Baylies (1817–1918) and Maturin Livingston, Jr. (1815–1888), who lived in Staatsburg, New York, and the granddaughter of Maturin Livingston (1769–1847), a member of the prominent American Livingston family, who was a lawyer and politician from New York. Her twin sister, Ruth T. Livingston (1855–1920), was the wife of Ogden Mills, and the mother of Ogden Livingston Mills, the United States Secretary of the Treasury. Together, they had:

- Mary Augusta Cavendish-Bentinck (1881–1913), who married John Gorman Ford (1866–1917), the 1st Secretary of the British Legation to Rome, son of diplomat Sir Clare Ford, on 3 November 1906.
- Ruth Evelyn Cavendish-Bentinck (1883–1978), who married Walter Spencer Morgan Burns (1872–1929), nephew of J. P. Morgan and grandson of Junius Spencer Morgan, both well-known American bankers, in 1907.

In 1899, Louisa Matilda Livingston, a cousin of Cavendish-Bentinck's wife, who was married to Elbridge T. Gerry, the grandson of grandson of US Vice-president Elbridge Gerry, gave a reception and dance in honour of their eldest daughter, Mary, in advance of her presentation the following spring at the Court of St. James and subsequent debut in London Society. The event was also the debut of Gerry's son, Peter Robert Goelet Gerry (1879–1957).

On 22 August 1909, Cavendish-Bentinck died, at age 55, at Forest Farm, Windsor, Berkshire. In 1914, his widow built a family mausoleum in the Churchyard of St Giles in Hertfordshire, designed by Robert Weir Schultz.
