= Maturin Livingston =

American judge

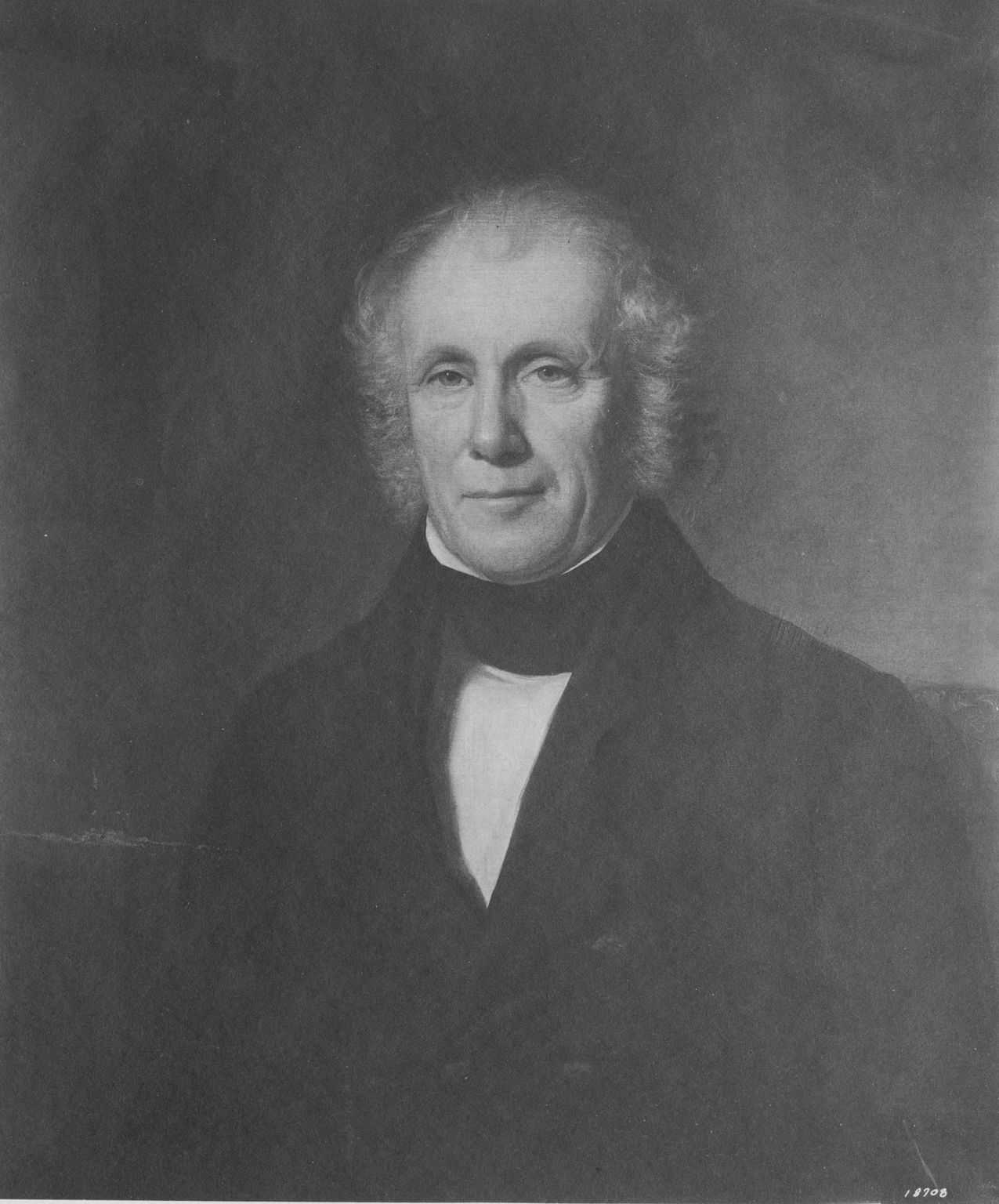

Recorder of New York City
- In office 1807–1808
- Preceded by: Pierre C. Van Wyck
- Succeeded by: Pierre C. Van Wyck
- In office 1804–1806
- Preceded by: John B. Prevost
- Succeeded by: Pierre C. Van Wyck

Personal details
- Born: April 10, 1769 New York City, Province of New York
- Died: November 7, 1847 (aged 78) New York City, New York
- Spouse: Margaret Lewis (m. 1798)
- Relations: Peter R. Livingston (brother); William Smith (grandfather); Morgan Lewis (father-in-law); Alexander Hamilton, Jr. (son-in-law)
- Children: 12
- Parent(s): Robert James Livingston; Susanna Smith
- Education: College of New Jersey

Maturin Livingston (April 10, 1769 – November 7, 1847), a member of the prominent Livingston family, was an American lawyer and politician from New York.

== Life ==
Maturin Livingston was born on April 10, 1769, in New York City. He was the son of Robert James Livingston (1725–1771) and Susanna (née Smith) Livingston (1729–1791), sister of Chief Justice William Smith (1728–1793) and daughter of Judge William Smith. His brother was Speaker Peter R. Livingston (1766–1847) and they were among the great-grandchildren of Robert Livingston the Younger (1663–1725), through the Younger's eldest son, James Livingston (1701–1763).

He graduated from the College of New Jersey in 1786.

== Career ==
In 1796, Livingston exchanged correspondence with Alexander Hamilton regarding Hamilton's understanding that Livingston had spoken ill of Hamilton's character. Livingston's daughter later married Hamilton's grandson, Alexander Hamilton, Jr.

Livingston was a delegate to the New York State Constitutional Convention of 1801, and was appointed Recorder of New York City from 1804 until 1806, and again from 1807 to 1808. He was First Judge of the Dutchess County Court from February 3, 1823, until 1828.

In 1831, he was one of the original incorporators and directors of the Jackson Marine Insurance Company, in New York City, and was appointed one of the three commissioners to receive subscriptions.

== Personal life ==
On May 28, 1798, he married Margaret Lewis (1780–1860), the only daughter and sole heiress of Gov. Morgan Lewis (1754–1844) and Gertrude (née Livingston) Lewis (1757–1833). Gertrude was the sister of Chancellor Robert R. Livingston and the daughter of Judge Robert R. Livingston and Margaret Beekman Livingston (daughter of Col. Henry Beekman). In 1844, upon the death of his father-in-law, they inherited Gov. Lewis's stately home Staatsburgh House in Staatsburg, Dutchess County, New York. Together, the couple had twelve children:

- Morgan Lewis Livingston (1799–1869), who married Catherine Manning (1809–1886).
- Julia Livingston (1801–1882), who married Maj. Joseph Delafield (1790–1875), son of John Delafield.
- Alfred Livingston (1803–1855)
- Gertrude Laura Livingston (1805–1883), who married Rawlins Lowndes (1801–1877), a descendant of Rawlins Lowndes.
- Mortimer Livingston (1807–1857)
- Susan Mary Livingston (1809–1875)
- Robert James Livingston (1811–1891), who married Louisa Matilda Storm (1807–1883).
- Lewis (1814–1886) married Julia Augusta Boggs
- Maturin Livingston Jr. (1816–1888), who married Ruth Baylies (1827–1918), and eventually inherited Gov. Lewis' house.
- Henry Beekman Livingston (1818–1862), who married Mary Lawrence Livingston (1821–1883), the daughter of John Swift Livingston (a grandson of Robert Livingston) and Anna Maria Martina Thompson, in 1844.
- Angelica Livingston (1820–1896), who married Alexander Hamilton, Jr. (1816–1889), son of James Alexander Hamilton and grandson of Alexander Hamilton, the first Secretary of the Treasury.
- Blanche Geraldine Livingston (1822–1897), who married Lydig Monson Hoyt (1821–1868).

He died at the residence of his son-in-law Maj. Joseph Delafield, in New York City.

=== Descendants ===
His granddaughter, Louisa Matilda Livingston (1836–1920), married Elbridge Thomas Gerry (1837–1927), grandson of the 5th U.S. Vice President Elbridge Gerry. Louisa was the mother of Robert Livingston Gerry, Sr. (1877–1957) and Peter Goelet Gerry (1879–1957), a U.S. Representative and Senator from Rhode Island.

His granddaughter, Elizabeth Livingston (1855–1943), through his son, Maturin Jr., married William George Cavendish-Bentinck (1854–1909), the son of The Rt. Hon. George Augustus Frederick Cavendish-Bentinck (1821–1891) and Prudentia Penelope Leslie (d. 1896). Elizabeth and George and had two daughters. Elizabeth had a twin sister, Ruth T. Livingston (1855–1920), who was the wife of Ogden Mills (1856–1929), and the mother of Ogden Livingston Mills, the United States Secretary of the Treasury.

Legal offices
Preceded by John B. Prevost	Recorder of New York City; 1804–1806	Succeeded by Pierre C. Van Wyck
Preceded by Pierre C. Van Wyck	Recorder of New York City; 1807–1808	Succeeded by Pierre C. Van Wyck
