= James Alexander Hamilton =

American soldier and politician and son of Alexander Hamilton (1788–1878)

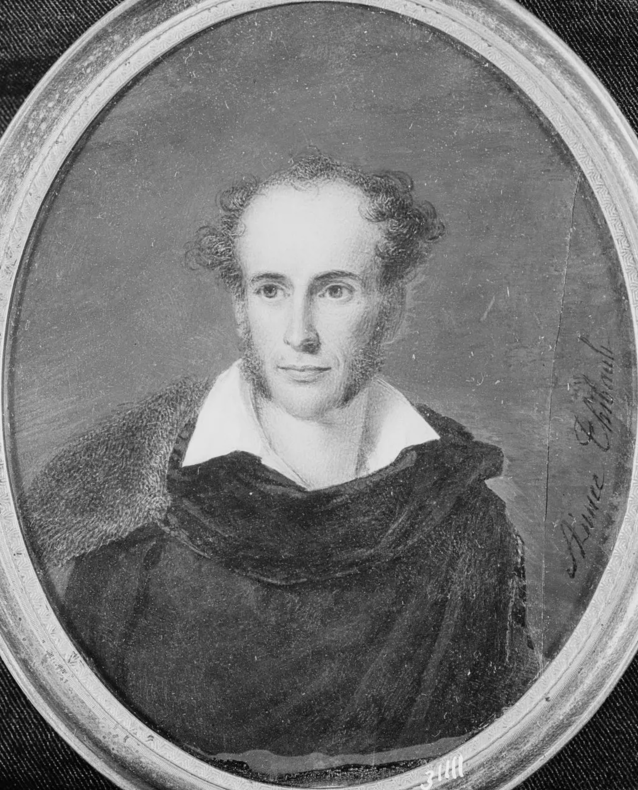

Acting United States Secretary of State
- In office March 4, 1829 – March 27, 1829
- President: Andrew Jackson
- Preceded by: Henry Clay
- Succeeded by: Martin Van Buren

4th United States Attorney for the Southern District of New York
- In office April 1829 – April 1834
- President: Andrew Jackson
- Preceded by: John Duer
- Succeeded by: William M. Price

Personal details
- Born: April 14, 1788 New York City, New York, U.S.
- Died: September 24, 1878 (aged 90) Irvington, New York, U.S.
- Resting place: Sleepy Hollow Cemetery, Sleepy Hollow, New York, U.S.
- Party: Democratic
- Spouse: Mary Morris (m. 1810; died 1869)
- Children: Elizabeth; Frances; Alexander Jr.; Mary; Angelica
- Parents: Alexander Hamilton; Elizabeth Schuyler Hamilton
- Relatives: See Hamilton family
- Education: Columbia College
- Profession: Lawyer

Military service
- Allegiance: United States
- Branch/service: United States Army; New York State Militia
- Rank: Major
- Battles/wars: War of 1812

James Alexander Hamilton (April 14, 1788 – September 24, 1878) was an American soldier, acting Secretary of State, and the third son of Alexander Hamilton, one of the Founding Fathers of the United States. He entered politics as a Democrat and supporter of Andrew Jackson.

== Early life and education ==
Hamilton was born in New York City on April 14, 1788, the fourth child of American Founding Father Alexander Hamilton and Elizabeth Schuyler Hamilton. Hamilton later wrote of his childhood:

[Alexander] Hamilton's gentle nature rendered his house a joyous one to his children...His interaction with his children was always affectionate and confiding, which excited in them a corresponding confidence and devotion. I distinctly recollect the scene at breakfast in the front room of the house in Broadway. My dear mother, seated as was her wont at the head of the table with a napkin in her lap, cutting slices of bread and spreading them with butter for the younger boys...When the lessons were finished the father and the elder children were called to breakfast, after which the boys were packed off to school.

During the summer of 1791, when James was three, he grew ill while he was visiting Albany, New York, with his mother, Elizabeth Schuyler Hamilton. Fortunately, he recovered within a month under the care of his mother and Doctor Samuel Stringer, the Hamilton family's doctor in Albany.

When James was sixteen, his father was killed in a duel with Vice President Aaron Burr. Along with his mother and siblings, James was present in the room, sitting at his father's bedside, when he died the day after the duel. Hamilton graduated from Columbia University in 1805 at the age of seventeen. At Columbia, James Alexander Hamilton was a founding member of the Philolexian Society. He later studied law, and in 1809, he was admitted to the bar, and practiced law for a year in Waterford, New York.

== Career ==
In 1810, Hamilton moved to Hudson, New York, and practiced law there for several years. During the War of 1812, Hamilton served as a Brigade Major and Inspector in the New York State Militia.

In March 1829, Hamilton served as acting Secretary of State to President Andrew Jackson, surrendering the office on the regular appointment of Martin Van Buren. That same year he was appointed U.S. Attorney for the Southern District of New York.

He sided with Jackson in opposing the Second Bank of the United States, the successor to the bank which had originally been invented by his father. In an 1830 letter to Jackson, Hamilton proposed that a substitute be created for the Bank, and articulated several supposed deficiencies with the present Bank. His arguments made against the institution were quite similar to those of Jackson. He claimed that the Bank was subversive to liberty and that it exerted unfair influence on the election process. The stock, he claimed, was owned mostly by foreigners, and thus the Bank could be controlled by forces hostile to the United States. Hamilton declared that the very institution was unconstitutional because Congress did not have the power to create it.

In 1867, he published a book of memoirs. In the book's preface, he writes that he was "induced to undertake this work by a desire to do justice" to his father "against the aspersions of Mr. Jefferson, and more recently of Martin Van Buren." His father's life and career, friends and rivals, are discussed at length in Hamilton's memoirs.

== Personal life ==
On October 17, 1810, Hamilton married Mary Morris (1790–1869), the daughter of Robert Morris (1762–1851) and Frances Ludlam (1766–1852). Mary was the older sister of Lewis Gouverneur Morris (1808–1900), the granddaughter of Richard Morris (1730–1810), Chief Justice of the New York Supreme Court, the great-granddaughter of Lewis Morris, an early colonial governor of New Jersey, and the grandniece of Lewis Morris (1726–1798), a signer of the Declaration of Independence. Hamilton later recalled their first years of marriage:

Both I and my wife were without means – our parents not being in a situation to do much for us. This I have always considered the most fortunate event of my life. I realized the embarrassments of my situation, and met them with the determination to overcome them. Nor did my resolution fail of its reward. Our self-denials were great, indeed, but our faith in the future was greater...Our poverty was so extreme that during our first year we boarded at four dollars per week for each. I now look back upon this event as not only the happiest, but the most fortunate occurrence of my long and eventful life. My poverty, with its burdens and responsibilities, nerved me to exertion, and necessity taught me the value of economy and self-denial.

Together, Hamilton and his wife had five children:

- Elizabeth "Eliza" Hamilton (1811–1863), who married her first cousin once-removed George Lee Schuyler (1811–1890), the son of Philip Jeremiah Schuyler
- Frances "Fanny" Hamilton (1813–1887), who married George Russel James Bowdoin (1809–1870).
- Alexander Hamilton Jr. (1816–1889), who married Angelica Livingston (1820–1896), the daughter of Maturin Livingston.
- Mary Morris Hamilton (1818–1877), who married George Lee Schuyler (1811–1890), her sister's widower
- Angelica Hamilton (1819–1868), who married Richard Milford Blatchford (1798–1875).

James Alexander Hamilton died on September 24, 1878, in Irvington, New York.

=== Residence ===
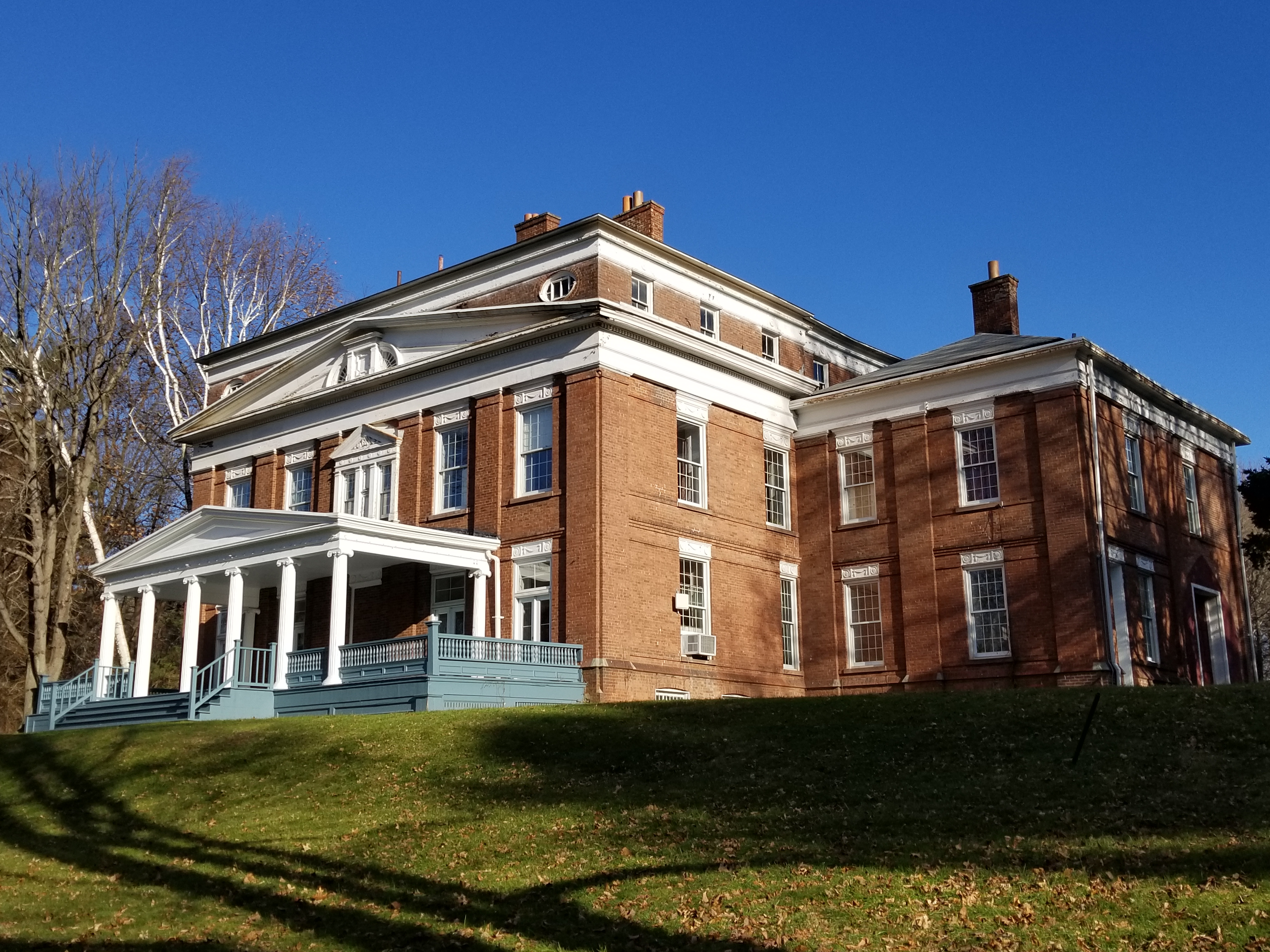
The Nevis Mansion

Hamilton built a large home in the Ardsley-on-Hudson section of Irvington, New York, which he named "Nevis" in honor of his father's birthplace in the British West Indies. It was originally "a simple Greek revival building with Doric columns", but in 1889 it was "extensively remodeled" by famed architect Stanford White. In 1934, Mrs. T. Coleman DuPont gave Nevis to Columbia University for the "establishment of a horticultural and landscape architecture center." Today the Nevis estate is a physics and biological research facility operated by Columbia University.
