= Staatsburgh State Historic Site =

Beaux-Arts mansion in New York, US

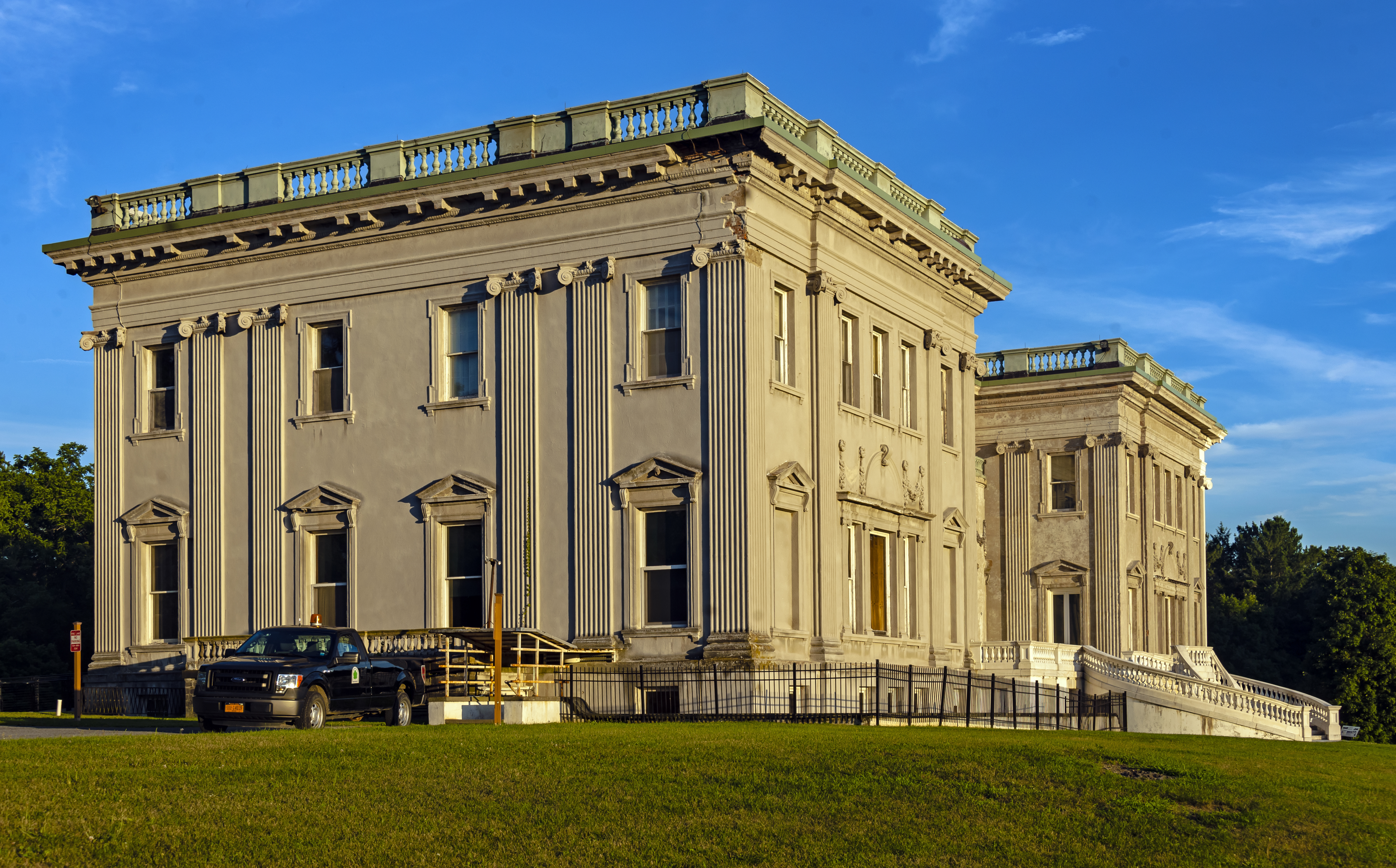
- North elevation and east (front) facade at sunset, 2016
- Interactive map of Staatsburgh State Historic Site
- 41°51′23.83″N 73°55′47.59″W
- Location: Staatsburg, Dutchess County, New York

Site notes
- Architect: McKim, Mead, and White
- Architectural style: Beaux-Arts

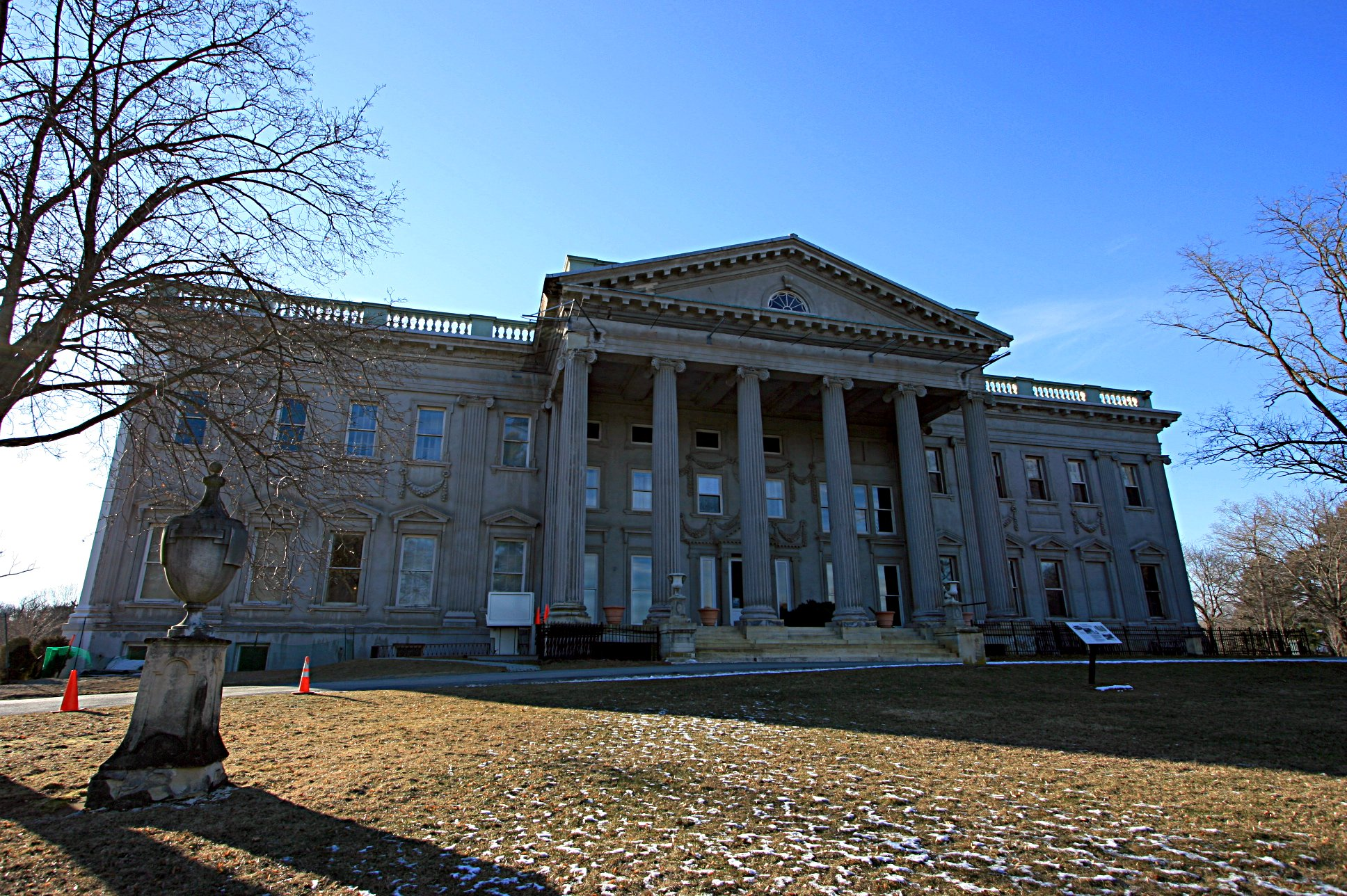
Livingston mansion, frontage

The Staatsburgh State Historic Site is located in the hamlet of Staatsburg, Dutchess County, New York, United States. The historic site preserves a Beaux-Arts mansion designed by McKim, Mead, and White and its surrounding landscape. It is located within Ogden Mills & Ruth Livingston Mills State Park. The mansion, a New York State Historic Site, is considered a fine example of the great estates built during the Gilded Age.

== History ==
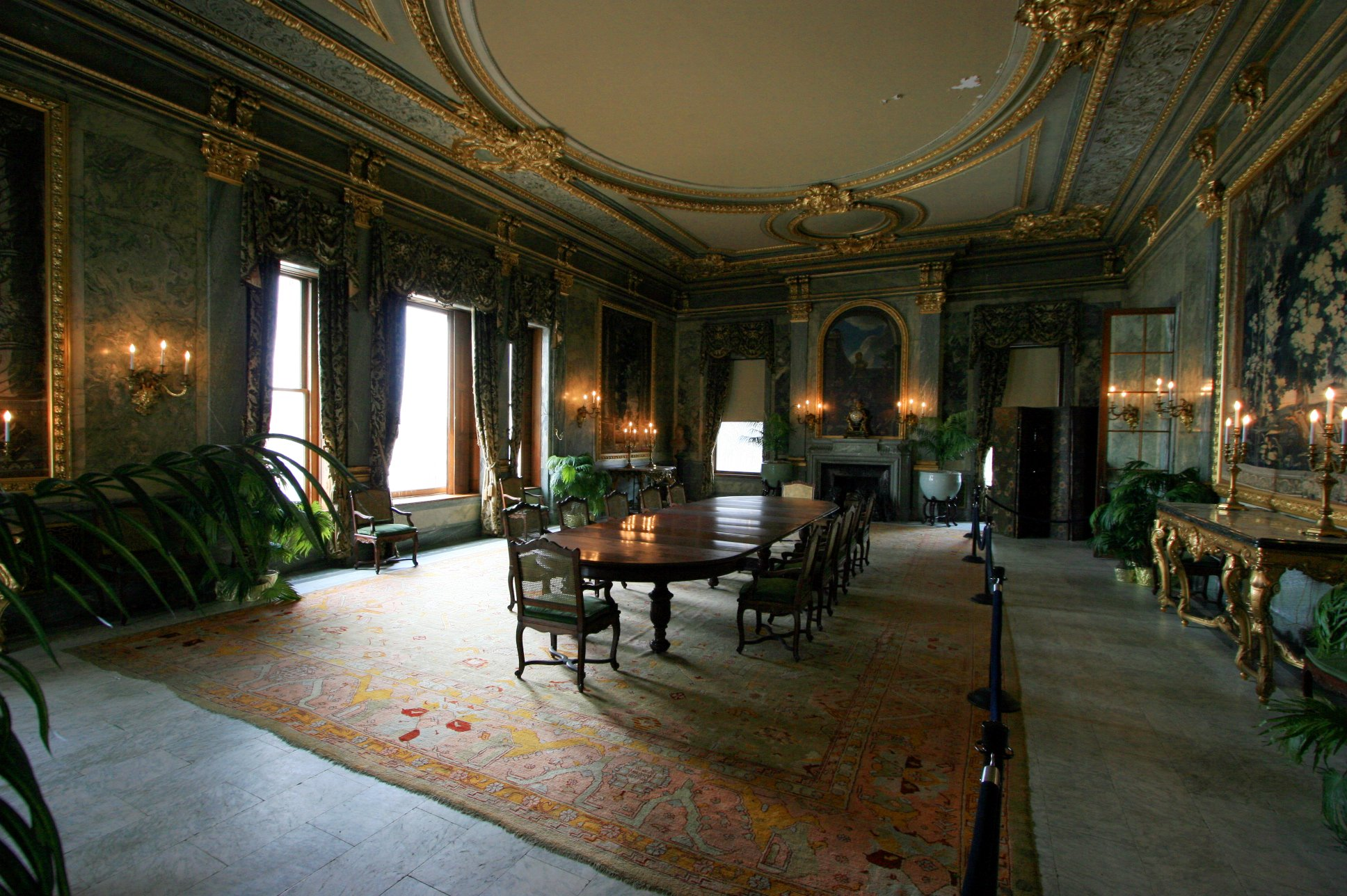
The dining room

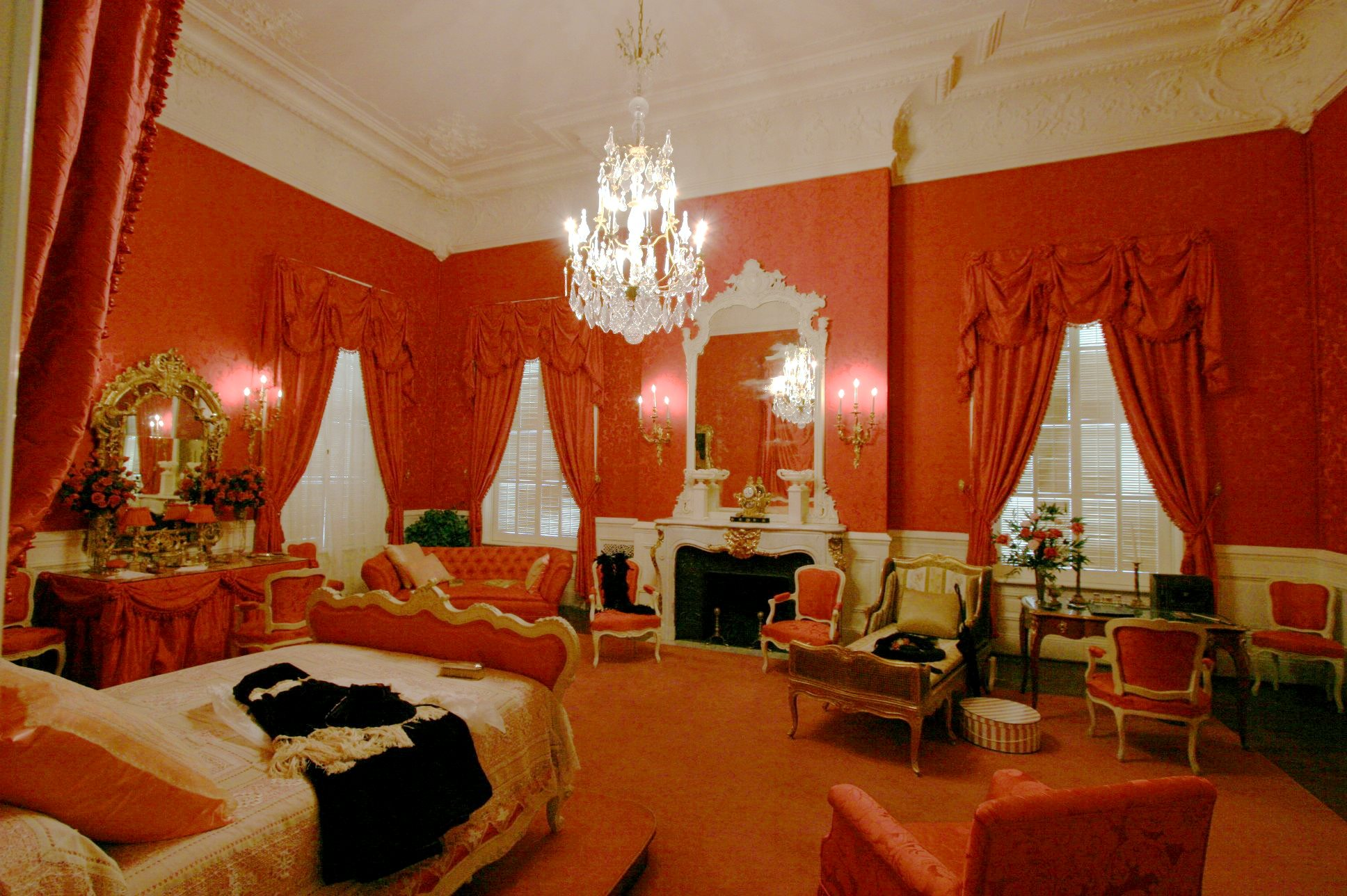
Ruth Livingston Mills's bedroom

In 1792, Morgan Lewis, the third governor of New York, purchased an estate covering of about 334 acres (135 ha) and commissioned the construction of a colonial-style house on the site of the present-day mansion. In the summer of 1824, on his visit to the United States, the Marquis de Lafayette dined there on his way upriver to visit Lewis' brother-in-law, Chancellor Livingston. In 1832, this first house was destroyed by a fire, said to be an act of arson committed by disgruntled tenant farmers. After the fire, Morgan Lewis and his wife, Gertrude Livingston, a sister of Chancellor Robert R. Livingston, immediately replaced the structure with a Greek Revival mansion with 25 rooms. The house was inherited in 1844 by Morgan Lewis's daughter Margaret and her husband Maturin Livingston; and in 1847 by the couple's son Maturin Livingston Jr. (1816–1888).

In 1890, Ruth Livingston Mills, the great-granddaughter of Morgan Lewis and the mother of Ogden L. Mills, Secretary of the Treasury, inherited the estate. Not long afterwards, Ruth Livingston Mills and her husband, the financier and philanthropist Ogden Mills, commissioned a remodeling and enlargement of the mansion to the architectural firm of McKim, Mead, and White; the principal architect was Stanford White. Work started in 1895 and when completed in the following year, he had turned the house into a Beaux-Arts mansion with 65 rooms, 14 bathrooms, and 23 fireplaces. The work is reported to have cost about $350,000. As part of the process, a coal-powered electricity plant was constructed near the Hudson River to supply the electric lights in the mansion, which was also equipped with central heating. The mansion was used as a residence and for entertaining by the family; they owned five homes in total, and stayed at Staatsburgh mainly during the fall season between mid-September and the Christmas holidays. During this time, they hosted house parties, balls, and dinners. At the remainder of the year, the family stayed in one of their other residences in New York City, Paris, Newport, Rhode Island, and California. Before her death, Ruth Livingston Mills began acquiring lands surrounding the estate. After her death in 1920, Ogden Mills continued to purchase the surrounding property, enlarging the acreage of the property to total over 1,600 acres (650 ha), the size of the mansion grounds at the time that it was given to the state of New York. In 1929, the property was passed on to their son, Ogden Livingston Mills and upon his death in 1937, on to his sister Gladys Mills Phipps.

In 1938, Gladys Mills Phipps donated the house and 192 acres (78 ha) of land to the state of New York as a memorial to her parents. As a State Historic Site, the estate is operated by the New York State Office of Parks, Recreation and Historic Preservation. In 1988, the Friends of Mills Mansion were organized to support the preservation and educational work at the site.

== Design ==
The outside of the mansion features a massive portico, balustrades, pilasters, and floral festoons. The central part of the mansion is layered into a basement, three floors, and an attic. In the north and south wings, there is a subbasement, a basement, and two floors. Ceilings in the older part of the building dating prior to the enlargement (the first floor of the central part) are about 14 feet (4.3 m) high, whereas the ceilings of the later construction (first floor of the north and south wings) can be about 18 feet (5.5 m) high. The interior of the building is decorated in French styles of the 17th and 18th century. However, some architectural elements of the previous home have been preserved in the process.

== Preservation ==
The Mills Mansion poses several challenges to preservation: On the outside, a gray sprayed concrete finish which was added later as a preservation measure needs to be removed and replaced with a more suitable surface treatment. At the same time, the decorative cornice and many decorative elements need to be either restored or replaced. On the inside of the building, wall paint and furnishing fabrics are in need of replacement, marble and wooden surfaces need to be cleaned and the objects of the mansion's collection need to be conserved.

== See also ==
- List of Gilded Age mansions
- List of New York State Historic Sites
