= Morgan Lewis (politician) =

American lawyer, politician and military commander (1754–1844)

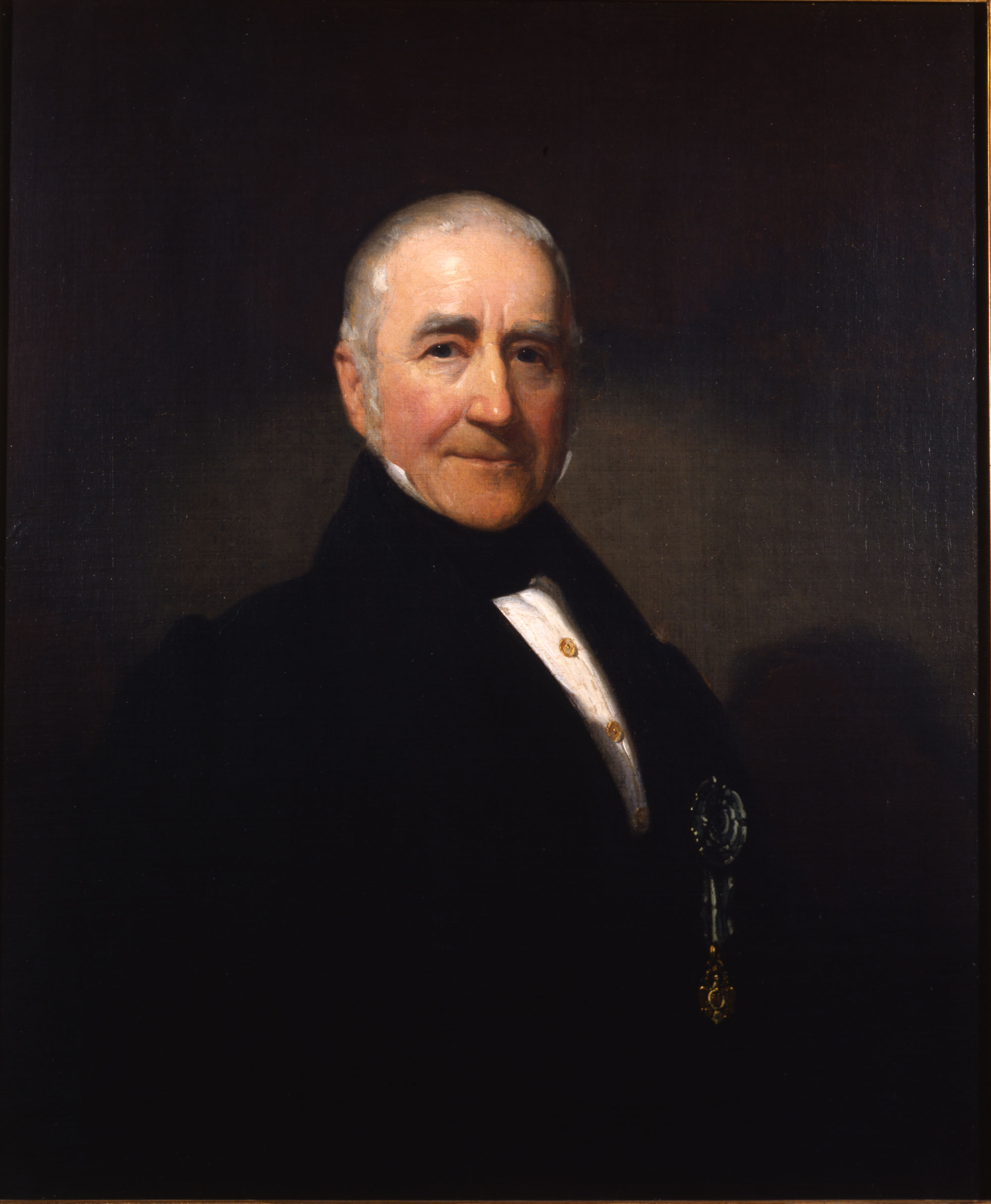
- Gubernatorial portrait of Morgan Lewis

3rd Governor of New York
- In office July 1, 1804 – June 30, 1807
- Lieutenant: John Broome
- Preceded by: George Clinton
- Succeeded by: Daniel D. Tompkins

New York State Attorney General
- In office November 8, 1791 – December 24, 1792
- Governor: George Clinton; John Jay
- Preceded by: Aaron Burr
- Succeeded by: Josiah Ogden Hoffman

Grand Master of the Masonic Grand Lodge of New York
- In office 1830–1843
- Preceded by: Stephen Van Rensselaer
- Succeeded by: Alexander H. Robertson

Personal details
- Born: October 16, 1754 New York City, Province of New York, British America
- Died: April 7, 1844 (aged 89) New York City, U.S.
- Party: Democratic-Republican
- Spouse: Gertrude Livingston (m. 1779; died 1833)
- Relations: Maturin Livingston (son-in-law)
- Children: Margret Lewis Livingston
- Parent(s): Francis Lewis; Elizabeth Annesley

Military service
- Branch/service: Continental Army; United States Army
- Years of service: 1774–?, 1812–1815
- Rank: Major General
- Battles/wars: Revolutionary War; War of 1812

Morgan Lewis (October 16, 1754 – April 7, 1844) was an American lawyer, politician, and military commander. The second son of Francis Lewis, a signer of the Declaration of Independence, Lewis fought in the American Revolutionary War and the War of 1812. He served in the New York State Assembly (1789, 1792) and the New York State Senate (1811–1814) and was New York State Attorney General (1791–1801) and the third governor of New York (1804–1807).

== Early life and education ==
Morgan Lewis was born on October 16, 1754, of Welsh descent, the second son of Francis Lewis (1713–1802) and Elizabeth (née Annisley) Lewis (1715–1778). Lewis grew up in Elizabethtown, New Jersey, where he decided to dedicate himself to the ministry. However, based on his father's advice, he attended the College of New Jersey, which is now Princeton University, graduating in 1773, and began to study law. He read law alongside John Jay. His studies were interrupted by military service during the American Revolutionary War, but he was admitted to the bar in 1783.

== Career ==
=== American Revolutionary War ===
From September 1, 1776, to the end of the war he was a colonel and the Quartermaster General for the Northern Department.

In 1774, he joined the American Revolution as a volunteer in the Continental Army. Lewis was then made a captain of a regiment of the New York militia. Once the 2nd New York militia regiment was organized, he was promoted to the rank of major. He was then appointed chief-of-staff to General Horatio Gates, with the rank of colonel, and accompanied him into Canada, and soon after congress appointed him quartermaster-general of the Northern Army. In 1775, he planned and executed the night attack on Stone Arabia, and was in command at the battle of Crown Point, where he was accompanied by New York Governor George Clinton. He was prominent throughout the campaign that ended with the surrender of John Burgoyne at Saratoga.

=== New York governor ===
After the Revolution, Lewis completed his legal studies while he lived in Albany, New York, boarding at the riverside home of James Bloodgood. In 1779, the tax list showed him living there with personal property valued at $2,000, one of the city's highest assessments. Later, he qualified for a "bounty right" as a member of the city regiment of the Albany County Militia. During that time, he acquired some Albany property. He was elected to the New York State Assembly, 1789 and 1792, and the New York State Senate from 1811 to 1814. He was New York State Attorney General (December 24, 1791 – October 28, 1801) and later Justice and Chief Justice (October 28, 1801) of the Supreme Court of New York.

He served as governor of New York from 1804 to 1807, defeating Vice President Aaron Burr in the race to succeed George Clinton as governor. In the New York gubernatorial election, 1804, he was largely responsible for splitting the Jeffersonian Republican Party in New York into "Lewisites" (allies of Lewis) and the "Clintonians" (allies of New York Mayor DeWitt Clinton) with his combination of Lewisites (labeled "Quids" by the Clintonians) and Federalists.

During his tenure, the United States Military Academy at West Point was established, the state's militia system was restructured, and educational improvements were sanctioned. On April 30, 1807, he was defeated in his run for re-election by Daniel D. Tompkins, also a future vice president. Tompkins received 35,074 votes, and Morgan Lewis received 30,989 votes. He then returned home to Staatsburg, Dutchess County, New York, where he turned his attention to agriculture. Having given up the practice of law, Lewis established a cloth factory, and for several years devoted himself to manufacturing. The failure of a mercantile house to which his goods were assigned caused him to discontinue the business.

=== War of 1812 ===
Prior to the War of 1812, Lewis declined the office of US Secretary of War under President James Madison. Instead, he resumed his duties as Quartermaster General and served in western New York. He was commissioned as a brigadier general on April 3, 1812, and was promoted to major general on March 2, 1813, as part of his service on the Niagara Frontier. He commanded the American forces at the Battle of Fort George. Although the British position was captured, Lewis ordered Colonel Winfield Scott to break off the pursuit of the defeated British troops. But for Lewis's overcaution, Scott might have been able to capture Major General John Vincent's entire division and greatly weaken the British defense of the Niagara Peninsula. Later, Lewis was appointed as commander of Upstate New York. He procured the release of the American prisoners in Canada, advanced from his private fortune the money for its accomplishment, and rewarded his own tenants who had served in or sent sons to the war by allowing them free rent for the time they served in the army. After the war, Lewis was discharged from the Army on June 15, 1815.

Lewis was a presidential elector in the presidential election of 1828.

== Personal life ==
In 1779, he married Gertrude Livingston (1757–1833), the daughter of Margaret Beekman and Judge Robert Livingston. They lived in Rhinebeck and then in Hyde Park in Dutchess County, New York. In 1790, his Rhinebeck household was served by eight slaves. Together, Morgan and Gertrude had:

- Margret Lewis (1780–1860), who married Maturin Livingston (1769–1847), a lawyer and politician from New York.

In 1792, Lewis, purchased an estate covering of about 334 acres (135 ha) in Staatsburg, New York, and commissioned the construction of a colonial-style house. In the summer of 1824, on his visit to the United States, the Marquis de Lafayette dined there on his way upriver to visit Lewis' brother-in-law, Chancellor Livingston.

In 1832, the house was destroyed by a fire, said to be an act of arson committed by disgruntled tenant farmers. After the fire, Lewis and his wife immediately replaced the structure with a Greek Revival mansion with 25 rooms. The house was inherited in 1844 after Morgan Lewis died, by his daughter Margaret and her husband, Maturin Livingston.

== Later life ==
Lewis was a Freemason and served as Grand Master in the Grand Lodge of New York from 1830 to 1843. From 1832 to 1835, he was the president of the Historical Society of New York. Lewis was an original member of the New York Society of the Cincinnati and served as its president general from 1839 to 1844. He also helped to found New York University in New York City.

Lewis died in New York City on April 7, 1844.

== Legacy ==
The following communities have been named in Lewis' honor:

- Lewis County, New York,
- The Town and Village of Lewiston, in New York,
- The Town of Lewis in Essex County, New York

Party political offices
Preceded by George Clinton	Democratic-Republican nominee for Governor of New York; 1804	Succeeded by Daniel D. Tompkins
Legal offices
Preceded by Aaron Burr	New York Attorney General; 1791–1792	Succeeded by Nathaniel Lawrence
Political offices
Preceded by George Clinton	Governor of New York; 1804–1807	Succeeded by Daniel D. Tompkins
Academic offices
Preceded by George Clinton	Chancellor of the University of the State of New York; 1806–1807	Succeeded by Daniel D. Tompkins
Masonic offices
Preceded by Stephen Van Rensselaer	Grand Master of the Grand Lodge of New York; 1830–1843	Succeeded by Alexander H. Robertson
Honorary titles
Preceded by Isaac Tichenor	Oldest living United States governor 1838–1844	Succeeded by William Plumer
Preceded by Samuel Ashe	Oldest United States governor ever 1842–1848	Succeeded by William Plumer
Non-profit organization positions
Preceded by Aaron Ogden	President General of the Society of the Cincinnati; 1839–1844	Succeeded by William Popham
