= Phipps family =

American family

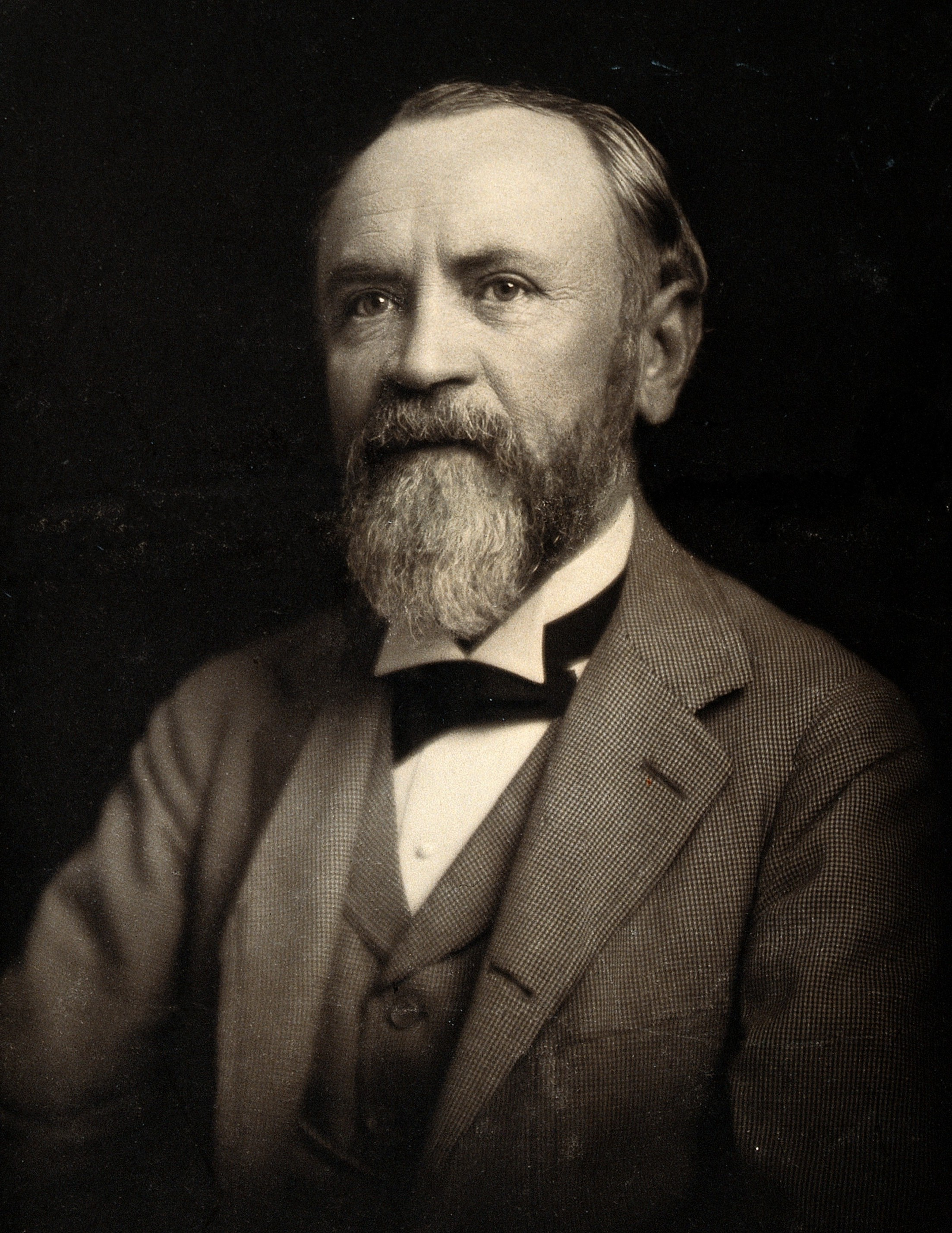
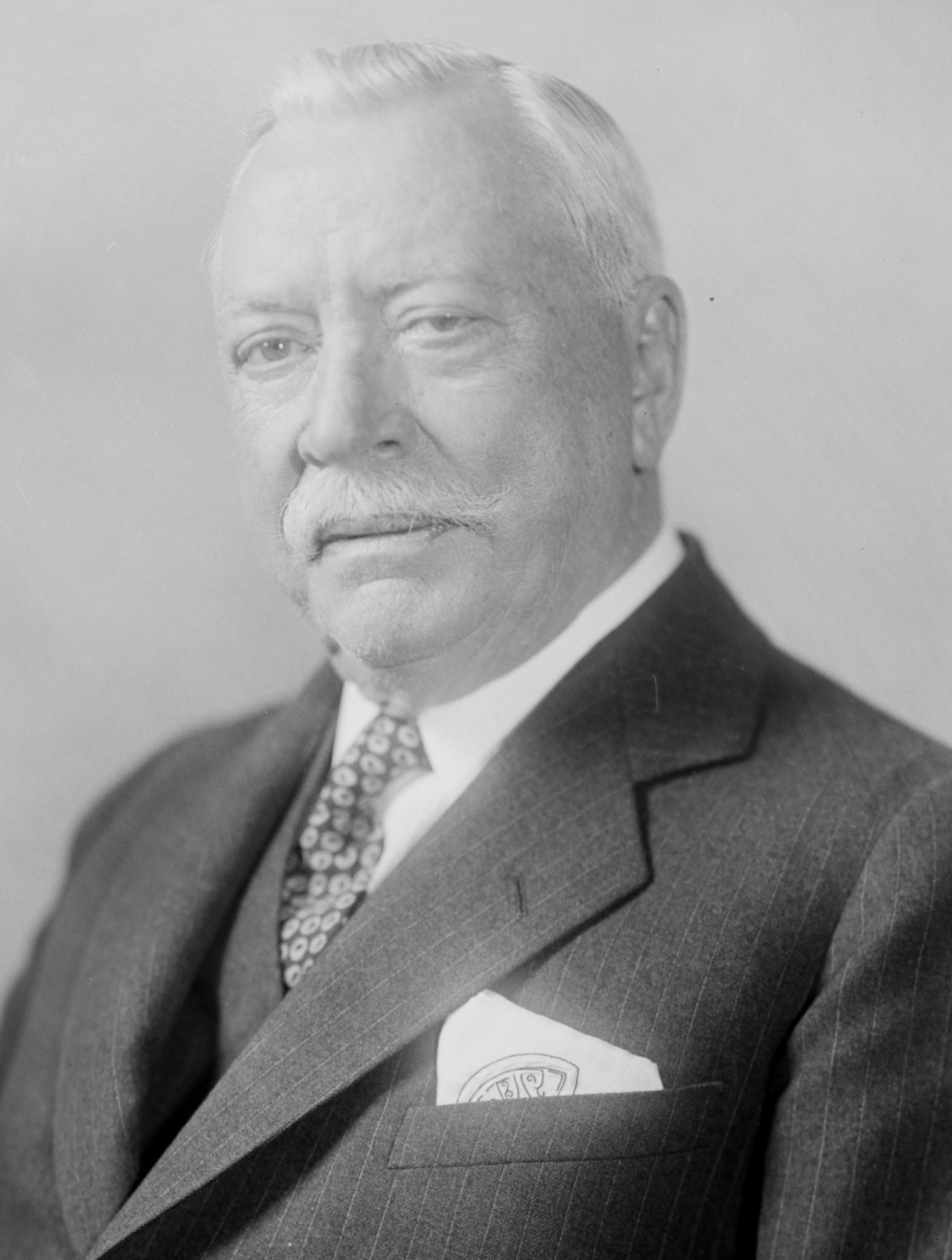
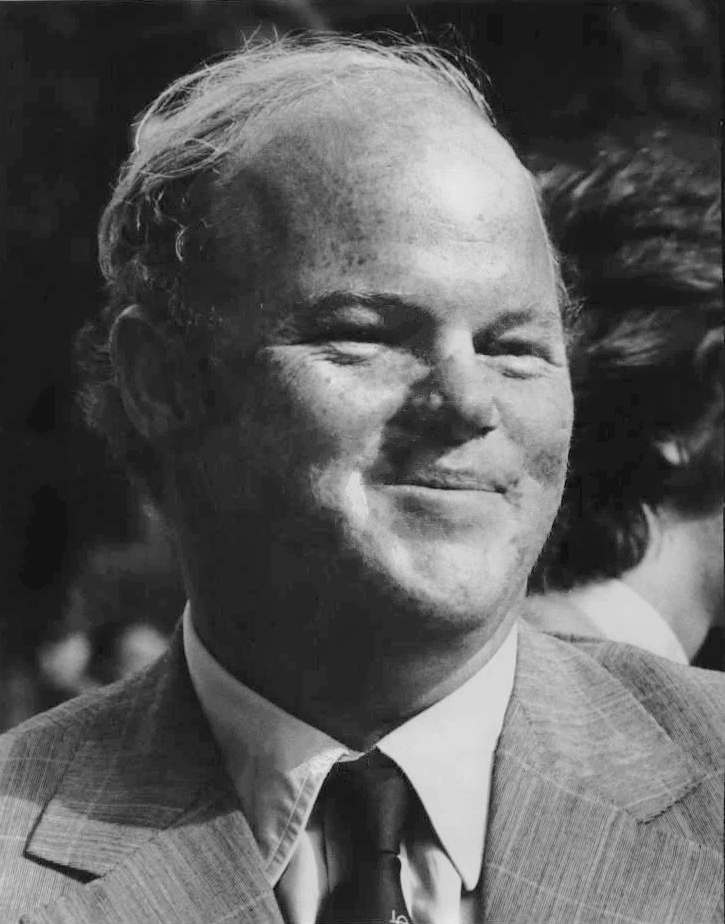
- Henry Phipps Jr. Lawrence C. Phipps Ogden Mills Phipps
- Current region: Philadelphia, Pennsylvania
- Origin: West Midlands, England
- Connected families: Grace family Mills family
- Estate: Old Westbury Gardens

The Phipps family of the United States is a prominent American family that descends from Henry Phipps Jr. (1839–1930), a businessman and philanthropist. His father was an English shoemaker who immigrated in the early part of the 19th century to Philadelphia, Pennsylvania, before settling in Pittsburgh. Phipps grew up with Andrew Carnegie as a friend and neighbor. As an adult, he was Carnegie's business partner in the Carnegie Steel Company and became a very wealthy man. He was the company's second-largest shareholder and also invested in real estate.

After selling his stock in Carnegie Steel, Phipps became a leading advocate of housing for the poor and a major philanthropist. He embraced the principle that those who have achieved great wealth should give back for the public good and create institutions dedicated to that purpose. Phipps and his wife Anne had five children: Amy, John S., Helen, Henry Carnegie, and Howard.

== Business activities ==
In 1907, Henry Phipps Jr. established the Bessemer Trust Company to manage his substantial assets that would be shared by his offspring following his death. Phipps was also one of the pioneer investors in Florida real estate. At one time, he and his family owned one-third of the town of Palm Beach, 28 miles of oceanfront between Palm Beach and Fort Lauderdale, prime bayfront property in downtown Miami, and 75 square miles of land in Martin County. The Phipps family donated to the town of Palm Beach one of the most significant gifts in county history: an ocean-to-lake frontage property that is now known as Phipps Park. Another contribution was the Phipps Conservatory and Botanical Gardens in Pittsburgh.

The Phipps family owned country estates in Old Westbury, New York, on the Gold Coast, the stretch of land on the North Shore of Long Island that once held the greatest concentration of wealth and power in America.

Phipps built a mansion on 115 acres in Lake Success, New York (also on the Gold Coast), which he called "Bonnie Blink" (Scottish for "pretty view") and used from its completion in 1919 until his death in 1930. During World War II, Phipps' son John Shaffer Phipps and his wife Margarita arranged for the home to be used to house British evacuees. In 1949, the family donated the property to the Great Neck School District. The mansion was converted into the administration building for the district, and Great Neck South High School and South Middle School were built on the site.

== Legacy ==
By 1974, Bessemer Trust Company developed an expertise in wealth management that allowed it to take on other clients through the creation of a national bank headquartered in New York City. Phipps' grandchildren, from his son John Phipps, donated to the public the Westbury House estate that is now known as Old Westbury Gardens.

Gladys Mills Phipps, granddaughter of Darius Ogden Mills and wife of Henry Carnegie Phipps, was prominent among horse breeders and owners in American Thoroughbred horse racing, as were her son, daughters and several grandchildren and great-grandchildren. She founded Wheatley Stable with her brother, Ogden Livingston Mills. The horse Orb, owned by first cousins Ogden Mills (Dinny) Phipps and Stuart Janney III (grandsons of Gladys Mills Phipps), won the 2013 Kentucky Derby.

== Lineage ==
Family members include:

- Henry Phipps Jr. (1839–1930), owner of Bonnie Blink, Lake Success
- Lawrence C. Phipps (1862–1958), nephew of Henry Phipps Jr., United States Senator from Colorado.
- Amy Phipps Guest (1872–1959), daughter of Henry Phipps Jr., owner of Templeton, Old Westbury, New York, and Villa Artemis, Palm Beach, Florida, sponsor of Amelia Earhart and wife of Frederick Edward Guest.
- John Shaffer Phipps (1874–1958), oldest son of Henry Phipps Jr., owner of Westbury House, Old Westbury and Casa Bendita, Palm Beach
- Helen Phipps Martin (1876–1934), daughter of Henry Phipps Jr., owner of Knole, Old Westbury
- Henry Carnegie Phipps (1879–1953), son of Henry Phipps Jr., owner of Spring Hill, Old Westbury and Heamaw, Palm Beach
- Howard Phipps (1881–1981), son of Henry Phipps Jr., owner of Erchless, Old Westbury
- Gladys Mills Phipps (1883–1970), wife of Henry Carnegie Phipps
- Lillian Bostwick Phipps (1906–1987), wife of Ogden Phipps
- Winston Frederick Churchill Guest (1906–1982), son of Amy Phipps Guest
- Raymond R. Guest (1907–1991), son of Amy Phipps Guest
- Ogden Phipps (1908–2002), son of Henry Carnegie Phipps
- Diana Guest Manning (1909–1994), daughter of Amy Phipps Guest
- Barbara Phipps Janney (1911–1987), daughter of Henry Carnegie Phipps
- Ogden Mills "Dinny" Phipps (1940–2016), son of Ogden Phipps
- Cynthia Phipps (1945–2007), daughter of Ogden Phipps
- Stuart Symington Janney III (born 1948), great-grandson of Henry Phipps Jr., grandson of Henry Carnegie Phipps
- William Cattell Trimble III (born 1962), great-great-grandson of Henry Phipps Jr., great-grandson of Henry Carnegie Phipps, grandson of Barbara Phipps Janney
- Andrew Sidamon-Eristoff (born 1963), great-grandson of Henry Phipps Jr., grandson of Howard Phipps
- Randolph Hobson Guthrie III (born 1967)

== Family tree ==
- Henry Phipps Sr. ∞ Hannah Frank
  - John Phipps
  - Henry Phipps Jr. (1839–1930) ∞ Anne Childs Shaffer (1850–1934) in 1872
    - Amy Phipps (1872–1959) ∞ Frederick Edward Guest (1875–1937) (grandson of John Spencer-Churchill, 7th Duke of Marlborough, and first cousin of Winston Churchill) in 1905
      - Winston Frederick Churchill Guest (1906–1982) ∞ (1) Helena Woolworth McCann (granddaughter of F. W. Woolworth) in 1934, div. 1944; ∞ (2) Lucy Douglas "C.Z." Cochrane (1920–2003) in 1947
        - Winston Alexander Guest (b. 1936) ∞ Helen Mane Elizabeth Shields in 1967
          - Winston Frederick Churchill Guest (b. 1968)
          - Helena Woolworth Guest (b. 1970)
          - Spencer Randolph Harrison Guest (b. 1984)
        - Frederick E. Guest II (b. 1938) ∞ (1) Stephanie Wanger in 1963; ∞ (2) Carole Baldoff in 1988
          - Victoria Woolworth Guest (b. 1966)
          - Vanessa Wanger Guest (b. 1973)
          - Frederick Edward Guest III (b. 1975)
          - Andrew Churchill Guest (b. 1976)
        - Alexander Michael Dudley Churchill Guest (b. 1954) ∞ Elizabeth Geacintov in 1986
          - Gregory Winston Churchill Guest (b. 1990)
        - Cornelia Cochrane Churchill Guest (b. 1963)
      - Raymond Richard Guest (1907–1991) ∞ (1) Elizabeth ("Lily") Polk (daughter of Frank Polk) in 1935, div.; ∞ (2) Ellen Tuck French Astor in 1953, div. ∞ (3) Princess Caroline Cecile Alexandrine Jeanne Murat (1923–2012) (granddaughter of Joachim Napoléon Murat, 5th Prince Murat) in 1960
        - Elizabeth Guest (b. 1937) ∞ (1) Edward Beach Condon in 1958, div; ∞ (2) George Stevens Jr. in 1965
        - Raymond Richard "Andy" Guest Jr. (1939–2001) ∞ (1) Patricia Hazard Donovan in 1962, div. 1971; ∞ (2) Mary Scott Derrick in 1979
        - Virginia Guest (b. 1947) ∞ Eugene Massie Valentine in 1991
        - Achille Murat Guest (b. 1961) ∞ (1) Capucine Motte; ∞ (2) Judith Wall
        - Laetitia Amelia Guest (b. 1965) ∞ Laurie Oppenheim
      - Diana Henrietta Cornelia Guest (1909–1994) ∞ (1) Marc Sevastopoulo in 1934, div.; ∞ (2) Count Jean de Gaillard de la Valdène (1895–1977) in 1943, div.; (3) Allen Manning in 1970
        - Diane Lorraine Sevastopoulo (b. 1935) ∞ (1) Pierre Firmin-Didot in 1955 ∞ (2) Arthur Peter Perkins in 1967
          - Isabelle Marie Firmin-Didot (b. 1962)
          - Christine Aimée Firmin-Didot (b. 1963) ∞ Antonio Bulridge in 1987
        - Count Guy Winston de Gaillard de la Valdène (b. 1944–2023) ∞ Thérèse Anderson (1941–2020) in 1965
          - Valery Elaine de la Valdène (1966–2014)
          - Jean Pierre de la Valdène (b. 1967)
        - Lorraine Aimee de Gaillard de la Valdène (b. 1946) ∞ Christian Odasso in 1978
          - Fréderic Christian Odasso (b. 1978)
          - Diana Melody Christina Odasso (b. 1979)
    - John Shaffer Phipps (1874–1958) ∞ Margarita Celia Grace (daughter of Michael P. Grace) in 1903
      - John H. H. Phipps (1904–1982) ∞ Elinor Klapp Phipps
        - John Eugene Phipps
        - Colin Srinagar Phipps
      - Hubert Beaumont Phipps (1905–1969) ∞ (1) Carla Gordon (d. 1950), her death; ∞ (2) Lady Phoebe Pleydell-Bouverie (1932–1995) (daughter of William Pleydell-Bouverie, 7th Earl of Radnor) in 1950, div. 1963
        - Melissa Adeane Phipps (b. 1955)
        - Hubert Grace Phipps (1957–2023)
      - Margaret Phipps Boegner (1906–2006) ∞ (1) J. Gordon Douglas Jr. in 1930, div. 1947; ∞ (2) Etienne Boegner (d. 1985) in 1951 (son of Marc Boegner)
        - J. Gordon Douglas III
        - Dita Amory Douglas ∞ Alick David Yorke Naylor-Leyland (1929–1991) (son of Albert Edward Herbert Naylor-Leyland, 2nd Baronet)
          - Nicholas Edward Naylor-Leyland
      - Michael Grace Phipps (1910–1973) ∞ Muriel Fillans "Molly" Lane
        - Susan Grace Phipps Cochran Santangelo Eigelberger
        - Elaine Lane "Nonie" Phipps Schippers (1939–1973)
    - Helen Margaret Phipps (1876–1934) ∞ Bradley Martin (brother-in-law of William Craven, 4th Earl of Craven) in 1904
    - Henry Carnegie Phipps (1879–1953) ∞ Gladys Livingston Mills (1883–1970) (twin sister of ((Jane)) Beatrice Forbes, Countess of Granard) in 1907
      - Ogden Phipps (1908–2002) ∞ (1) Ruth Pruyn in 1930, div. 1935; ∞ (2) Lillian Stokes Bostwick McKim (1906–1987) in 1937
        - Henry Ogden Phipps (1931–1962) ∞ Diana Phipps Sternberg
        - Robert Lansing Phipps (1933–2026)
        - Ogden Mills "Dinny" Phipps (1940–2016)
        - Cynthia Phipps (1945–2007)
      - Beatrice Audrey Phipps (1915–1992) ∞ Philip Dana Holden (1909–1973)
      - Sonia Phipps (1919–2002) ∞ (1) Herbert Farrell Jr., div.; ∞ (2) Count Hans Christoph von Seherr-Thoss (1912–1992)
      - Barbara Phipps (1911–1987) ∞ Stuart Symington Janney Jr. (1907–1988)
        - Stuart Symington Janney III ∞ Lynn Buchheit
          - Matthew Janney
          - Emily Janney
    - Howard Phipps (1881–1981) ∞ Harriet Dyer Price (granddaughter of Alexander B. Dyer) in 1931
      - Howard Phipps Jr.
      - Anne Phipps

== Family network ==
=== Associates ===
The following is a list of figures closely aligned with or subordinate to the Phipps family.

- Andrew Carnegie
- Thomas M. Carnegie
- William Ellis Corey
- Henry Clay Frick
- Grace family
- Elbert Henry Gary
- Freddie Guest
- Arthur B. Hancock Jr.
- George Lauder Jr.
- John George Alexander Leishman
- Bradley Martin Jr.
- Shug McGaughey
- Ogden L. Mills
- Addison Mizner
- Edward A. Neloy

=== Businesses ===
The following is a list of companies in which the Phipps family have held a controlling or otherwise substantial interest.

- Ayavalla Land Company
- Bessemer Properties
- Bessemer Trust
- Bessemer Venture Partners
- Denver Broncos
- The Fauquier Democrat
- Ingersoll Rand
- International Hydro-Electric System
- International Paper
- New England Power Association
- Orchard Pond Organics
- Palm Beach Company
- Phipps Land Company
- Snow Phipps Group, LLC
- U.S. Steel
- WCTV
- Wheatley Stable

=== Philanthropy & miscellaneous non-profits ===
- Elinor Klapp-Phipps Park
- Caribbean Conservation Corporation
- Gulf Stream Golf Club
- Gulfstream Polo Club
- Henry Phipps Psychiatric Clinic
- Howard Phipps Foundation
- John S. Phipps Family Foundation
- Phipps-Florida Foundation
- Phipps Houses
- Phipps Institute for the Study, Treatment & Prevention of Tuberculosis
- Phipps Tuberculosis Dispensary
- William A. Shine Great Neck South High School

== Buildings, estates & historic sites ==
- Ayavalla Plantation
- Bonnie Blink
- El Cid Historic District
- Old Westbury Gardens
- Orchard Pond Plantation
- Phipps Conservatory and Botanical Gardens
- Phipps Garden Apartments
- Phipps Mansion (Belcaro)
- Phipps Plaza
- Rockburn Stud Farm
- Spring Hill

== Sources ==
- Boegner, Peggie Phipps; Gachot, Richard (1987). Halcyon Days: An American Family Through Three Generations. Harry N. Abrams, Inc. ISBN 0-8109-1064-0. (daughter of John Shaffer Phipps)
- Ingham, J.N. (1983). Biographical Dictionary of American Business Leaders. Westport, CT: Greenwood Press. ISBN 0-313-23907-X.
- Phipps Family Papers in America, New York: Bessemer Trust Co.
- "Love of horses helped to build a dynasty". The Sydney Morning Herald. April 30, 2002.
