= Ogden Phipps =

American businessman (1908–2002)

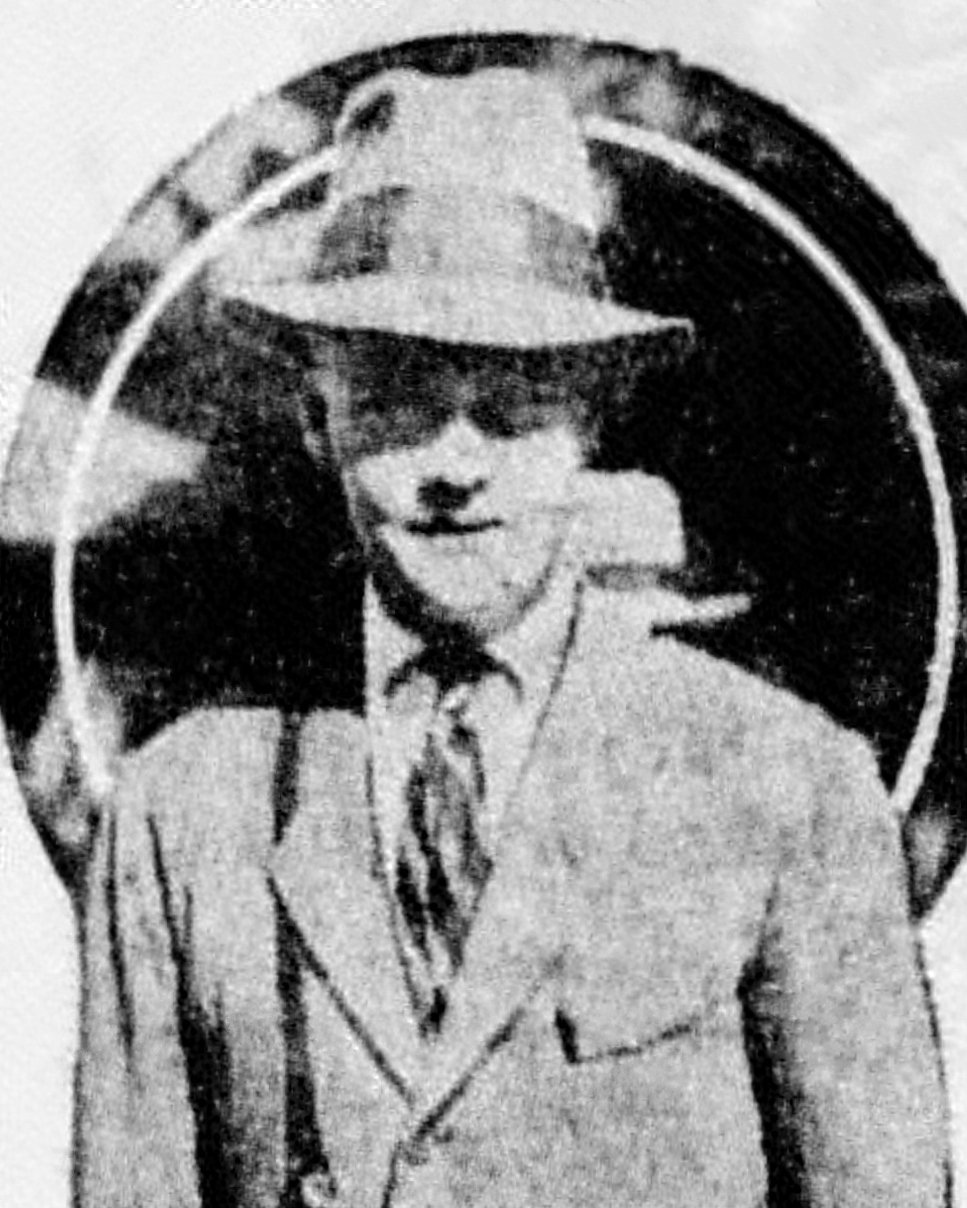
- Phipps in 1929
- Born: November 26, 1908; New York City, U.S.
- Died: April 21, 2002 (aged 93); West Palm Beach, Florida, U.S.
- Occupations: Financier; tennis player; racehorse owner/breeder; philanthropist
- Spouses: Ruth Pruyn (m. 1930; div. 1935) Lillian Stokes Bostwick McKim (m. 1937; died 1987)
- Children: 4, including Ogden
- Parents: Henry Carnegie Phipps; Gladys Livingston Mills
- Relatives: Barbara Phipps Janney (sister); Beatrice Mills (aunt); Ogden L. Mills (uncle); John Shaffer Phipps (uncle); Frederick Guest (uncle); Winston F. C. Guest (cousin); Ogden Mills (grandfather); Henry Phipps Jr. (grandfather)
- Awards: Eclipse Award for Outstanding Breeder (1988); Eclipse Award for Outstanding Owner (1988, 1989); Eclipse Award of Merit (2003)
- Honors: U.S. Racing Hall of Fame – Pillars of the Turf (2019); Ogden Phipps Handicap at Belmont Park

Ogden Phipps (November 26, 1908 – April 21, 2002) was an American stockbroker, court tennis champion and Hall of Fame member, thoroughbred horse racing executive and owner/breeder, and an art collector and philanthropist. In 2001, he was inducted into the International Court Tennis Hall of Fame.

== Early life ==
Ogden Phipps was born in New York City on November 26, 1908, the son of Henry Carnegie Phipps and Gladys Livingston Mills. He was named for his mother's brother, Ogden L. Mills. His grandfather Henry Phipps Jr. was a major philanthropist who had amassed a fortune as the second-largest shareholder in the Carnegie Steel Company. Educated at Harvard University, Ogden Phipps became a champion court tennis player, capturing the U.S. championship seven times and the British championship once.

During World War II, Ogden Phipps served with the United States Navy. After the war, he became a partner in the prominent brokerage firm, Smith Barney & Co. then used his training to head up Bessemer Securities Corporation, a private holding company that managed the fortune left to Phipps family members by their grandfather.

== Career ==
=== Thoroughbred racing ===
His mother and uncle loved Thoroughbred horses and formed Wheatley Stable in 1926 as a partnership that successfully raced and bred Thoroughbreds. Influenced by his mother, Ogden Phipps first registered his own black with cherry cap racing silks in 1932.

After World War II, Ogden Phipps bought a group of horses from the estate of Colonel Edward R. Bradley that formed the basis for what would become his major horse racing operation. Like his family's Wheatley Stable, Phipps too would use Claiborne Farm in Paris, Kentucky, for breeding and developing of his horses. In 1959 he became a founding member of the New York Racing Association and a member of its board of trustees. Approaching his 80th birthday, he resigned in 1988 and was named a director emeritus. He also served as a chairman of The Jockey Club for twenty years and at the time of his death was the club's longest-reigning member.

Ogden Phipps owned and bred Reviewer, who sired Ruffian for his sister, Barbara Phipps Janney. He inherited the stallion Bold Ruler from his mother's estate, who was mated with the mare Somethingroyal in 1969. Through the toss of a coin, Penny Chenery, on behalf of her father Christopher Chenery, got the red chestnut colt Secretariat, the 1973 Triple Crown Winner.

Ogden Phipps bred nine champions of his own, winning Eclipse Awards for both leading owner and leading breeder in 1988. His most famous horses include Buckpasser, Personal Ensign, and Easy Goer, all of whom are in the United States Racing Hall of Fame. He never won the Kentucky Derby but came close twice, finishing second with Dapper Dan in 1965 and second again in 1989 with Easy Goer, who went on to win the Belmont Stakes. He won two British Classic Races, taking the St. Leger Stakes with Boucher in 1972 and the 1,000 Guineas at Newmarket Racecourse with Quick As Lightning. He won four Breeders' Cup races. First with the undefeated Personal Ensign in 1988, then Dancing Spree in 1989, Inside Information and My Flag in 1995.

Four Hall of Fame trainers conditioned Phipps' horses, beginning with the renowned Sunny Jim Fitzsimmons, who also trained for his mother's Wheatley Stable. After Fitzsimmons' retirement, Bill Winfrey came out of retirement to train for him in 1963 then Eddie Neloy took over in 1966, followed by John Russell in 1973, Angel Penna Sr. in 1977 and Shug McGaughey in 1985.

In 2003, Ogden Phipps was voted the Eclipse Award of Merit and in 2019 the American Thoroughbred horse racing industry's highest honor as a Hall of Fame Pillar of the Turf.

=== Business career ===
In 1969, Phipps Plaza opened as the first multi-level mall in Atlanta, aiming to become the South's leading luxury shopping destination. The mall originally opened with two levels. Purchased by Ogden Phipps in 1966 for less than $600,000, the development was sold in 1992 to Simon Property Group for $488 million.

== Personal life ==
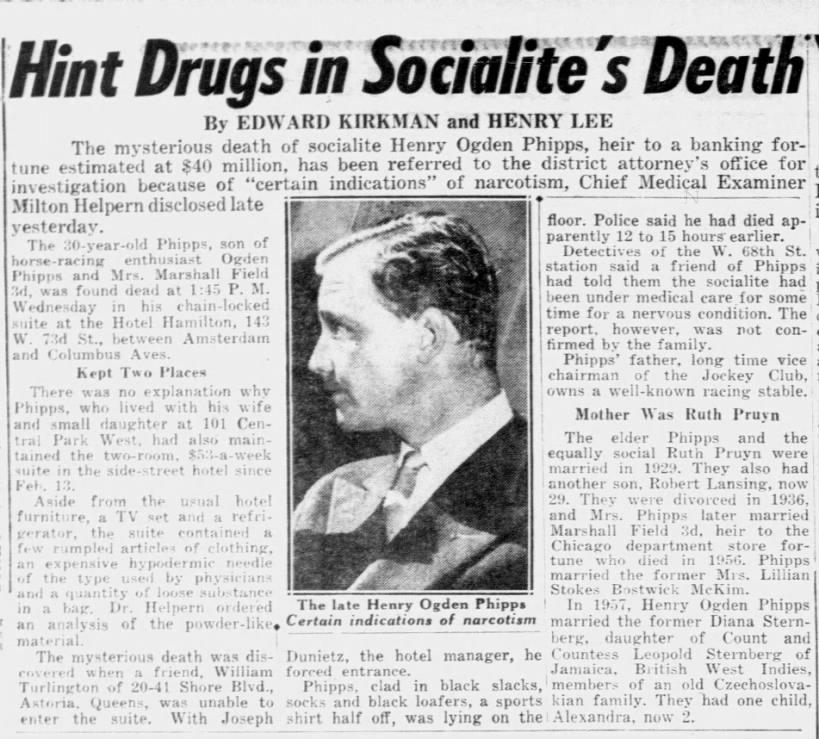
Henry Ogden Phipps

On June 14, 1930, Phipps married Ruth Pruyn (1907–1994) of Glen Cove, New York. Before divorcing in 1935, they had two children:

- Henry Ogden Phipps (1931–1962), who died by suicide.
- Robert Lansing Phipps (April 8, 1933 — May 26, 2026)

After the divorce, Ruth Phipps remarried in 1936 to Marshall Field III. Ogden Phipps remarried on November 4, 1937, to divorcee Lillian Stokes Bostwick McKim (1906–1987), the sister of Hall of Fame steeplechase jockey George Herbert Bostwick. Lillian would become a major figure in American steeplechase racing who owned two U.S. Racing Hall of Fame horses and won the American Grand National eight times. She was also the mother of three daughters from her first marriage to Robert McKim, and together, Ogden and Lillian had two more children:

- Ogden Mills Phipps (1940–2016)
- Cynthia Phipps (1945–2007), who died as a result of injuries sustained in a fire in her Manhattan apartment.

Ogden Phipps was 93 when he died on April 21, 2002, at Good Samaritan Medical Center in West Palm Beach, Florida. Friend and fellow Thoroughbred owner Marylou Whitney called Phipps's death "the end of an era in racing".

=== Collections and philanthropy ===
Ogden and Lillian Phipps acquired 18th century French and English furniture and were early clients of Denning & Fourcade, who decorated fifteen homes for them, and they made many acquisitions through them. Ogden Phipps had an art collection that included works by Claude Monet and John Singer Sargent. He also maintained a greenhouse collection of orchid varieties from around the world.

An honorary governor of the New York-Presbyterian Hospital, Phipps continued the family's philanthropic work. The Ogden Phipps Handicap at Belmont Park is named in his honor.

== In popular culture ==
In the film Secretariat, released in 2010, Ogden Phipps was portrayed by actor James Cromwell.
