= Henry Phipps =

Henry Phipps may refer to:

- Henry Carnegie Phipps (1879–1953), sportsman and financier
- Henry Phipps Jr. (1839–1930), entrepreneur and major philanthropist
- Henry Phipps, 1st Earl of Mulgrave (1755–1831), soldier and politician

== See also ==
- Henry Phipps House, New York City
