= Barbara Phipps Janney =

American socialite and racehorse owner (1911–1987)

- Born: Barbara Phipps; June 24, 1911; Roslyn, New York
- Died: November 30, 1987 (aged 76); Glyndon, Maryland
- Burial place: Reisterstown, Maryland
- Occupations: Socialite and thoroughbred horse owner, breeder
- Known for: Owner of Ruffian
- Spouse(s): Stuart Symington Janney Jr., married 1936
- Parents: Henry Carnegie Phipps (father); Gladys Mills Phipps (mother)
- Relatives: Ogden Phipps (brother); Henry Phipps, Jr. (grandfather); Ogden Mills (grandfather)
- Family: Phipps family

Barbara Phipps Janney (June 24, 1911– November 30, 1987) was an American socialite, sportsperson, and thoroughbred racehorse owner and breeder. A member of the Phipps family, she and her husband Stuart Symington Janney Jr. were best known for being the owners of the ill-fated Ruffian.

== Biography ==
Barbara Phipps was born in Roslyn, New York in 1911, the daughter of Gladys Mills Phipps and Henry Carnegie Phipps. Phipps grew up on Long Island, and was educated in both New York and Europe. In July 1929, she made her debut as a debutante in New York. As a youth, she was known for her proficiency as a tennis player and equestrienne.

On June 8, 1936, she married Stuart S. Janney Jr., a Baltimore attorney, amateur jockey and winner of the Maryland Hunt Cup. That year, they purchased the 400-acre Locust Hill Farm in Glyndon, Maryland, where they would keep horses for recreation, participating in steeplechase racing and fox hunting.

=== Horse racing and Locust Hill Farms ===
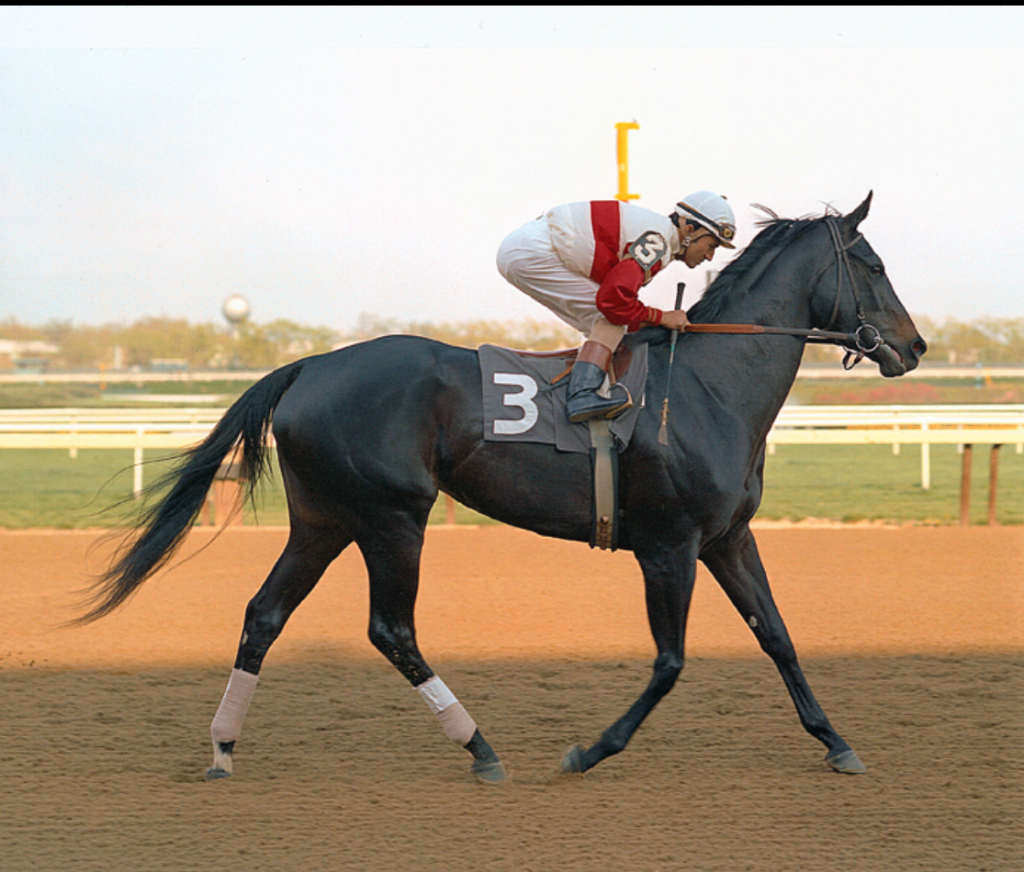
Ruffian, pictured 1975

The Phipps family enjoyed many connections to thoroughbred racing. Barbara Phipps Janney became involved with the horse industry at an early age, as the daughter of "The First Lady of the Turf". Her grandfather Ogden Mills owned horse racing stables in both the United States and France. Her mother and uncle Ogden Livingston Mills led the Wheatley Stable, a horse racing and breeding partnership known for breeding champion racehorses including Seabiscuit and Bold Ruler.

By the 1950s, Janney and her husband began breeding racehorses on a small scale at Locust Hill, encouraged by her mother. Barbara Phipps's family gave the couple their first three mares for their breeding operation: Bold Irish, Step Over and Vowed. One of their early success stories, the mare Shenanigans was foaled in 1963. She would found a dynasty of champions for the couple; her progeny would include Icecapade, Private Terms and Ruffian. The Janneys would go on to produce 19 homebred stakes winners with their Locust Hill Farms stable.

=== Ruffian ===
In 1975, Barbara and Stuart S. Janney's champion filly Ruffian was undefeated and a winner of the filly triple crown. Considered one of the world's most impressive racehorses, and the greatest filly in North American thoroughbred racing history, she was fatally injured during a match race against the champion colt Foolish Pleasure.

=== Personal life and death ===
She and Stuart Janney had four children, including Stuart S. Janney III (born 1948), who would follow his parents' interest in horse racing. They also had three daughters: Sheila [Janney] Williams (1937-2023), Barbara [Janney] Trimble (born 1938; daughter-in-law of Ambassador William C. Trimble), and Sarah [Janney] Rose (1954-1989).

Alongside racing, Janney was known for her love of traditional field sports, including sports fishing and fox hunting, pastimes shared by many in the Phipps family. She died at home in Glyndon, Maryland on November 30, 1987 at the age of 76.
