= Henry Carnegie Phipps =

American sportsman and financier

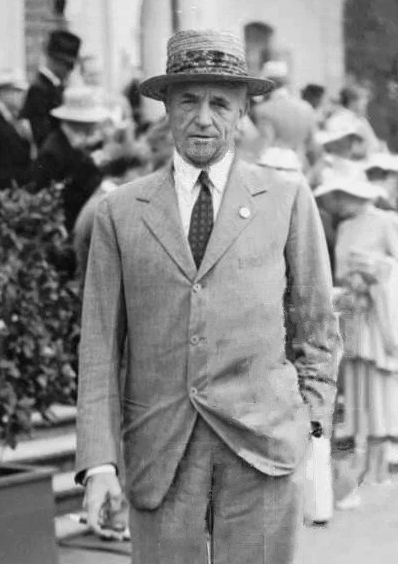
- Phipps in 1939
- Born: May 11, 1879; Pittsburgh, Pennsylvania, US
- Died: March 21, 1953 (aged 73); Palm Beach County, Florida, US
- Education: Yale University
- Known for: Owner of Wheatley Stable
- Spouse: Gladys Livingston Mills (m. 1907)
- Children: 4, including Ogden and Barbara Phipps Janney
- Parent(s): Henry Phipps Jr. Anne Childs Shaffer
- Relatives: Ogden Mills Phipps (grandson); Stuart S. Janney III (grandson)

Henry Carnegie Phipps (May 11, 1879 – March 21, 1953) was an American sportsman and financier, the owner of Wheatley Stable along with his wife Gladys Mills Phipps, and a member of the wealthy Phipps family.

== Early life ==
Phipps was born on May 11, 1879, in Pittsburgh, Pennsylvania. He was the second son of Anne Childs (née Shaffer) Phipps (1850–1934), and businessman Henry Phipps Jr. His siblings included Amy Phipps, who married Frederick Guest (a grandson of the 7th Duke of Marlborough and Winston Churchill's first cousin); John Shaffer Phipps, married Margarita Celia Grace (a daughter of Irish merchant Michael P. Grace); Helen Margaret Phipps, who married Bradley Martin Jr. (brother-in-law of the 4th Earl of Craven); and Howard Phipps, who married Harriet Dyer Price (granddaughter of Gen. Alexander Dyer).

At Henry Phipps' death, his father, who was at one time the second-largest shareholder of Carnegie Steel and was a founder of Bessemer Trust, was worth $3,121,810 (equivalent to $60,166,000 in 2025), according to transfer tax appraisal documents.

Phipps graduated from Yale University in 1902.

== Thoroughbred racing and breeding ==
The Wheatley Stable was the nom de course for a Thoroughbred racing partnership formed in 1926 by Gladys Mills Phipps and her brother, Ogden Livingston Mills. They became a major owner and breeder in Thoroughbred racing with numerous champions including 1957 American Horse of the Year Bold Ruler who went on to be an eight-time Leading sire in North America and whose progeny included the legendary Secretariat.

Phipp's daughter Barbara and her husband Stuart also became involved in the sport of thoroughbred racing and most notably bred and raced the ill-fated Ruffian, a U.S. Racing Hall of Fame inductee widely regarded as one of the greatest fillies in racing history.

== Personal life ==
In December 1907, Phipps married Gladys Livingston Mills (1883–1970) at her parents' home in Staatsburg, New York. Gladys was the daughter of famed financier Ogden Mills and the twin sister of Beatrice, who married Bernard Forbes, 8th Earl of Granard. Her brother Ogden was the 50th U.S. Secretary of the Treasury. As a wedding present, her father bought them a marble‐fronted townhouse at East 85th Street and Fifth Avenue. They also had a home Westbury, which reportedly cost $800,000, a home in Palm Beach, Florida, known as Heamaw. Together, they were the parents of:

- Ogden Mills Phipps (1908–2002), a chairman of The Jockey Club who married (1st) Ruth Pruyn (1908–1994) in 1930 (marriage dissolved by divorce) and married (2nd) Lillian Stokes Bostwick (1904–1987) in 1937, a granddaughter of a founding partner of Standard Oil.
- Barbara Phipps (1911–1987), who married Stuart Symington Janney Jr.
- Audrey Phipps (1915–1992), who married Philip Dana Holden (1909–1973), an investment banker.
- Sonia Phipps (1919–2006), who married Count Hans Christoph von Seherr-Thoss (1912–1992).

Phipps died at his winter home in Palm Beach on March 21, 1953. His estate was left to his widow, who died in 1970.

=== Descendants ===
Through his son Ogden, he was the grandfather of Ogden Mills Phipps (1940–2016), a financier and horse breeder who served as chairman of the family's Bessemer Trust until his retirement in 1994.

Through his daughter Barbara, he was the maternal grandfather of Stuart S. Janney III (b. 1948), a lawyer, financier and fellow horseman.
