= Ogden Mills =

Ogden Mills may refer to:

- Ogden Mills (financier) (1856–1929), American businessman, father of Ogden L. Mills
- Ogden L. Mills (1884–1937), American lawyer, businessman, politician and Secretary of the Treasury
