= Bessemer Venture Partners =

American venture capital firm

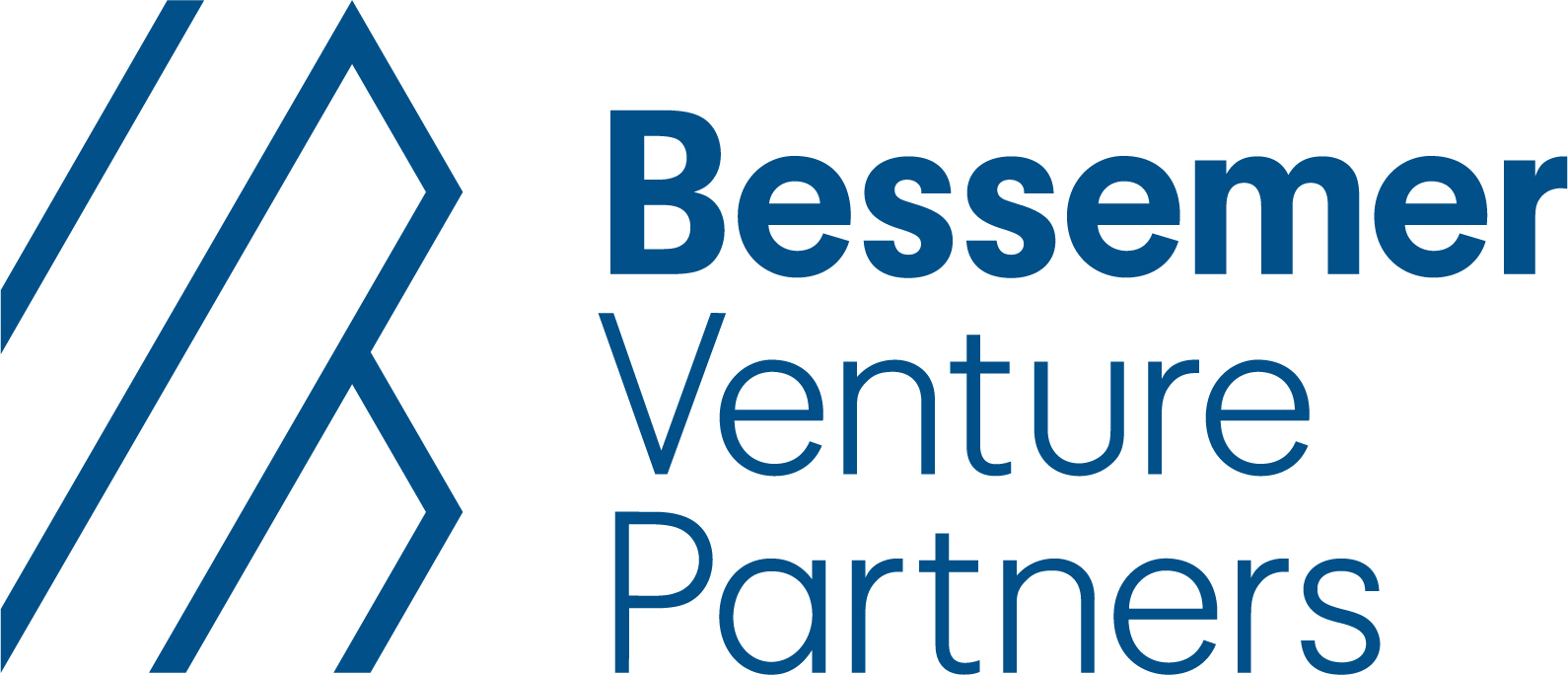
- Type: Private
- Industry: Investment management
- Founded: 1911; 115 years ago
- Headquarters: San Francisco, California, U.S.
- Products: Venture Capital; Private equity
- AUM: US$20 billion (2022)
- Number of employees: 151 (2022)
- Parent: Bessemer Securities
- Website: www.bvp.com

Bessemer Venture Partners (BVP) is an American venture capital and private equity firm headquartered in San Francisco. Outside the United States, it has offices in India, Israel, Hong Kong, and the United Kingdom. In 2024, Venture Capital Journal ranked the firm as the 3rd largest venture capital firm based on total fundraising over the most recent five-year period.

== History ==
In 1911, Henry Phipps Jr., a co-founder of Carnegie Steel, formed Bessemer Trust in New York to manage his family's assets. In 1911, he spun out Bessemer Securities as a separate entity which had $20 million assets under management which invested in venture capital deals, publicly traded securities and real estate.

In 1974, Bessemer Trust began accepting outside investors, while Bessemer Securities continued managing only the Phipps family’s money, allowing it to take on riskier investments in private tech and medical companies.

In 1975, Bessemer Securities opened an office in Silicon Valley.

In the 1970s, Bessemer Securities suffered from significant losses due to real estate investments.

In 1986, Bessemer Securities had $950 million assets under management and had continued to expand its investment team by hiring venture capital specialists.

Eventually the venture capital investment operation of Bessemer Securities was spun out separately as Bessemer Venture Partners. Bessemer Securities is still considered the parent company of BVP as it provides funding and support to the firm.

In 2000, BVP started investing in areas outside the U.S. which included India, Israel, Latin America and Europe. It also briefly had an office in China before closing it in 2006.

In 2007, BVP closed Bessemer Venture Partners VII which was its first fund that took capital from outside investors. Prior to that, capital was provided only by the Phipps Family or by Bessemer Securities.

In 2021, BVP set up a private equity team and in September 2022, the team now called BVP Forge closed its first buyout fund ($780M) alongside BVP's announcement of their 12th early stage fund ($3.85B).

In September 2026, BVP announced that it had raised $5.75 billion across two investment funds, allocating $1.75 billion to seed and early-stage investments and $4 billion to growth-stage investments.
