= Rebecca Patterson (economist) =

American economist and investment strategist

- Education: Masters Degree
- Alma mater: University of Florida, Johns Hopkins University, New York University
- Occupation: Economist

Rebecca Patterson is an American investor. She chairs the Council for Economic Education.

She was Chief Investment Strategist at Bridgewater Associates.

== Education ==
Patterson holds a bachelor's degree in journalism from the University of Florida, a Master of Arts (MA) in international economics from Johns Hopkins University, and a master of business administration (MBA) from New York University.

== Career ==
Patterson has worked since 1990 in the private sector. She has studied how politics and policy intersect with economic trends to drive financial markets. She worked at JPMorgan as a researcher in the firm's investment bank. She served as chief investment strategist in the asset management arm of the firm Patterson also ran the private bank's global currency and commodity trading desk. She was Chief Investment Officer of Bessemer Trust and previously served as the chief investment strategist for Bridgewater Associates.

She is a member of the Council on Foreign Relations and the Economic Club of New York.
