= Capital Education Group =

Capital Education Group (CEG) is the operator of American schools and programs for children and adolescents with autism and other specialized learning needs. Capital Education Group's stated mission is, "To change lives through leadership in education." The organization aspires to become the nation's leading manager of private schools and programs for children with autism and other specialized learning needs.

== History ==
Headquartered in Washington, D.C., Capital Education Group operates schools and programs throughout Maryland, Virginia and Chicago. The organization was founded in 2009 by Erik Heyer, a social entrepreneur who had been on the founding team of Victory Schools, a national leader in the charter school and public education reform movements Capital Education is a portfolio company of Novak Biddle Venture Partners (NBVP)

== Programs ==
Capital Education aims to create national model programs and schools. The organization operates three programs.

1. The Auburn School, which is a school for students with social and communication challenges. Auburn currently has three campuses: Herndon, Virginia; Silver Spring, Maryland and Baltimore, Maryland.
2. Camp Aristotle, which is a summer camp focused on exploratory learning, for students with social and communication challenges. The focus of the camp is to encourage social interaction amongst the campers who may have struggled in the past with social situations.
3. Little Leaves Behavioral Services, which provides therapy to children with autism spectrum disorders and related conditions. The approach is based on the principles of Applied Behavior Analysis (ABA).

== Recognition ==
During 2010 Global Entrepreneurship Week, Capital Education Group was recognized by the National Venture Capital Association, as exemplifying entrepreneurship in education.

In 2010, Capital Education Group was also honored by the Venture Capital Journal as one of the nation's Top 20 Most Promising Startups. Capital was the only Washington, DC area company to make the list, ranking 14th overall. While most of the start-ups listed were Silicon Valley Tech Companies, Capital Education was selected for its unique focus on schools and programs for students with autism and other specialized learning needs.
