= Soheil Alavi =

- سهیل علوی
- Occupations: Entrepreneur, product designer, and podcaster
- Known for: Founding Reyhoon, co-founding Tribe/Bettermode, and hosting the Tabaghe 16 podcast

Soheil Alavi (Persian: سهیل علوی) is an Iranian entrepreneur, product designer, and podcaster based in Canada., product designer, and podcaster based in Canada. He is the founder of the online food-ordering platform Reyhoon, a co-founder of the online community platform Tribe, later renamed Bettermode, and the host of the Persian-language podcast Tabaghe 16.

== Career ==
=== Product design and Reyhoon ===
Before launching Reyhoon, Alavi worked in product development and design in Canada. His profile on the Inovia Capital website describes him as a former lead product designer at the digital music company Tunzy, which was acquired in 2013. According to the same source, he also served as an entrepreneur-in-residence at the DMZ of Toronto Metropolitan University, then known as Ryerson University.

In a report published on 15 July 2015, Wamda described Alavi as an Iranian developer and designer who had returned to Iran after working in Toronto. At the time, he was preparing an initial funding round for Reyhoon, an online food-ordering platform. Inovia Capital has also described him as the chief executive officer and co-founder of an online food-delivery business in Iran.

=== Tribe and Bettermode ===
Tribe was founded in 2018 by Alavi, Siavash Mahmoudian, and Mohsen Malayeri. BetaKit described all three founders as immigrants from Iran to Canada. The company developed a software platform that allowed businesses to create online communities centred on their brands, products, and customers.

On 29 June 2021, Tribe announced that it had raised US$7.5 million in seed funding. The funding round was led by Bessemer Venture Partners and CRV, with participation from Inovia Capital.

By 30 June 2022, Tribe had been rebranded as Bettermode. Alavi's profile on the Inovia Capital website lists him as a co-founder and chief product officer of Bettermode.

== Tabaghe 16 podcast ==
Tabaghe 16 is a Persian-language podcast hosted by Alavi. It features discussions about startups, technology, and aspects of its guests' professional and personal lives. The podcast's name refers to the sixteenth-floor residence in Toronto where Alavi began recording its conversations.

As of 5 August 2026, more than 200 episodes of the podcast had been published on Acast. In an interview published on 17 November 2025, Alavi said that he had stepped away from the company's day-to-day operations and was focusing more closely on developing the podcast.
