= Darius Ogden Mills =

American banker and philanthropist (1825–1910)

- Born: September 25, 1825; North Salem, New York, U.S.
- Died: January 3, 1910 (aged 84); Millbrae, California, U.S.
- Resting place: Sleepy Hollow Cemetery, Sleepy Hollow, New York
- Education: Mt. Pleasant Academy
- Occupations: Banker, investor, mining & railway executive, philanthropist
- Spouse: Jane Templeton Cunningham (m. 1854)
- Children: Ogden Mills; Elisabeth Mills
- Relatives: Ogden L. Mills (grandson); Ogden Mills Reid (grandson); Gladys L. Mills (granddaughter); Jane B. Mills (granddaughter); Jean T. Reid (granddaughter)

Darius Ogden Mills (September 25, 1825 – January 3, 1910) was a prominent American banker and philanthropist. For a time, he was California's wealthiest citizen. He was also a co-founder of General Electric.

== Early life ==
Mills was born in North Salem, in Westchester County, New York, the fifth son of Hannah Ogden (1791–1850) and James Mills (1788–1841), a supervisor, postmaster and justice of the peace for the town of North Salem. His maternal grandfather was William Ogden (1767–1815), who was from Dutchess County and a member of the prominent Ogden family of New York and New Jersey. He was educated at North Salem Academy and Mt. Pleasant Academy.

== Career ==
Shortly after his father's death in 1841, he began working as a clerk in a small general store in New York City at the age of 15. At age 21, he moved to Buffalo, New York, at the invitation of his cousin, Elihu J. Townsend (the son of Malinda Ogden Townsend, his mother's sister), and became the cashier of the Merchants' Bank of Erie County, and later a one third owner.

In December 1848, he took an exploratory trip to California, through the Isthmus of Panama, where he joined the California Gold Rush, following two of his brothers, James and Edgar Mills. By November 1849, he had made $40,000 (~$1.19 million in 2024) and decided to make California his permanent home. Therefore, in 1850, he returned to Buffalo where he sold his interest in the Bank and returned to Sacramento, where he founded his own bank, the "Gold Bank of D. O. Mills & Co." This was helped significantly by a cousin from the English branch of the Mills family, Charles Mills, 1st Baron Hillingdon, who ran the Glyn, Mills & Co. bank in London. He never invested in gold mining or silver mining directly, as he considered mining to be too speculative. He rather started ancillary businesses that supported the mining industry, such as banks and railroads. He was a part owner of the Virginia and Truckee Railroad, which was the only link from the Comstock Lode to the Central Pacific Railroad. The major shareholder in the railroad was William Sharon, whom William Ralston had sent to Virginia City as representative of the Bank of California.

Engraving by J. A. J. Wilcox, 1881

In August 1884, Mills, Alvinza Hayward, a San Francisco mining tycoon, and several other investors purchased 720 acres encompassing a mineral spring in Saratoga, California the chemical content of which was almost identical to Saratoga Springs, New York for a reported $2,000. In 1866, they opened the 14-room Congress Hall to great local acclaim, and in 1872 sold the property to Lewis P Sage and son for approximately $25,000. Also in 1864, with other investors, he founded the Bank of California, which grew large in the 1860s and 1870s, but collapsed due to financial irregularities involving its chief cashier, William Chapman Ralston. Mills used his personal fortune to revive the bank, along with Sharon, and attract new investment, and within three years, the bank was again strong.

=== Later life ===
In 1880, two years after resigning from his second term as the president of the Bank of California, Mills returned to New York, where he participated in the development of a number of buildings in Manhattan, including 160 Bleecker Street, or "Mills House No. 1". He also invested in the Niagara Falls Power Company, one of the first large power companies organized in the United States. His devotion to philanthropy involved sitting on the boards of a number of charitable and cultural institutions. He was a trustee of the Carnegie Institution from 1902 to 1909.

== Millbrae estate ==
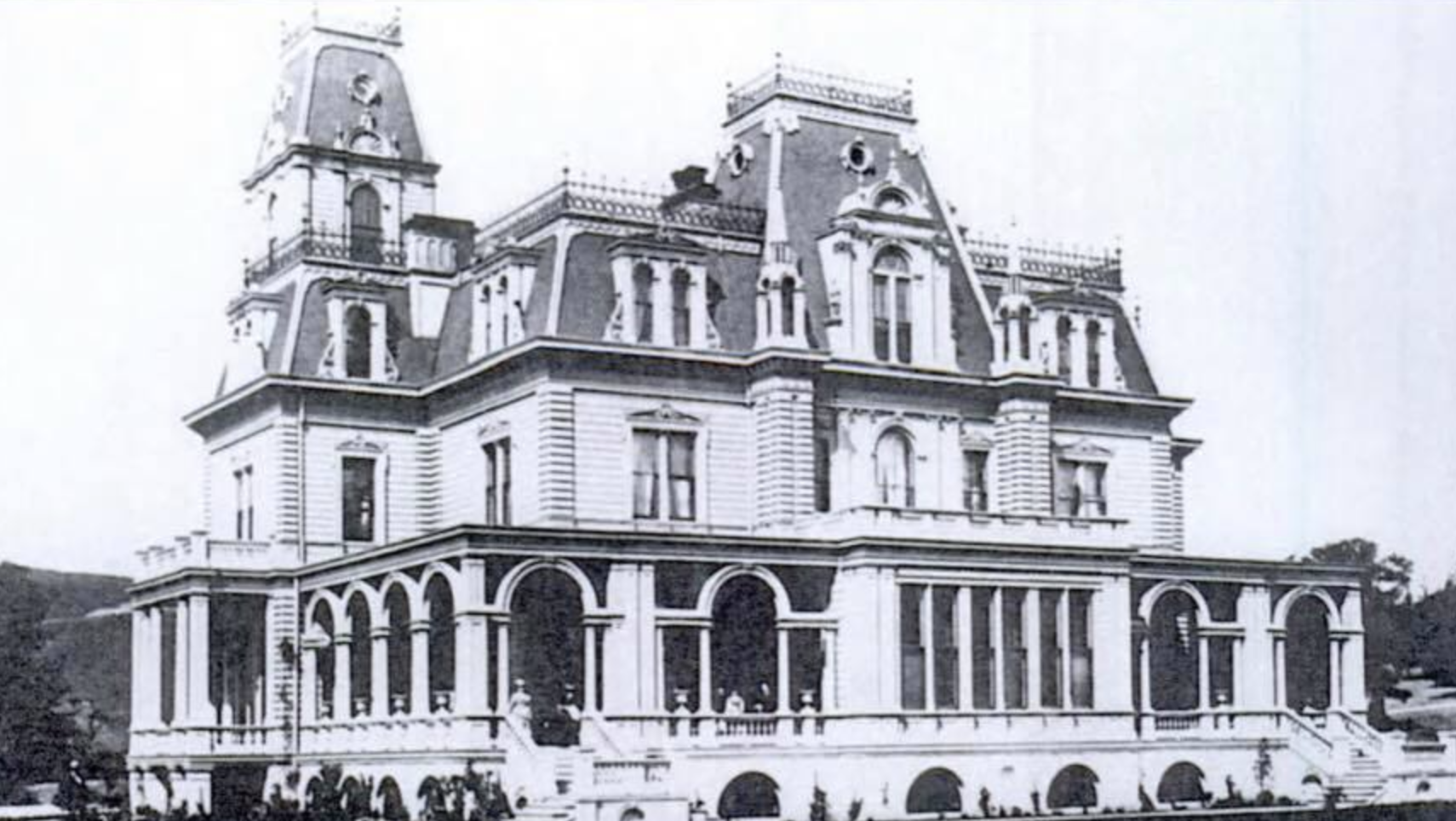
Millbrae estate (1869–1954), c. 1895

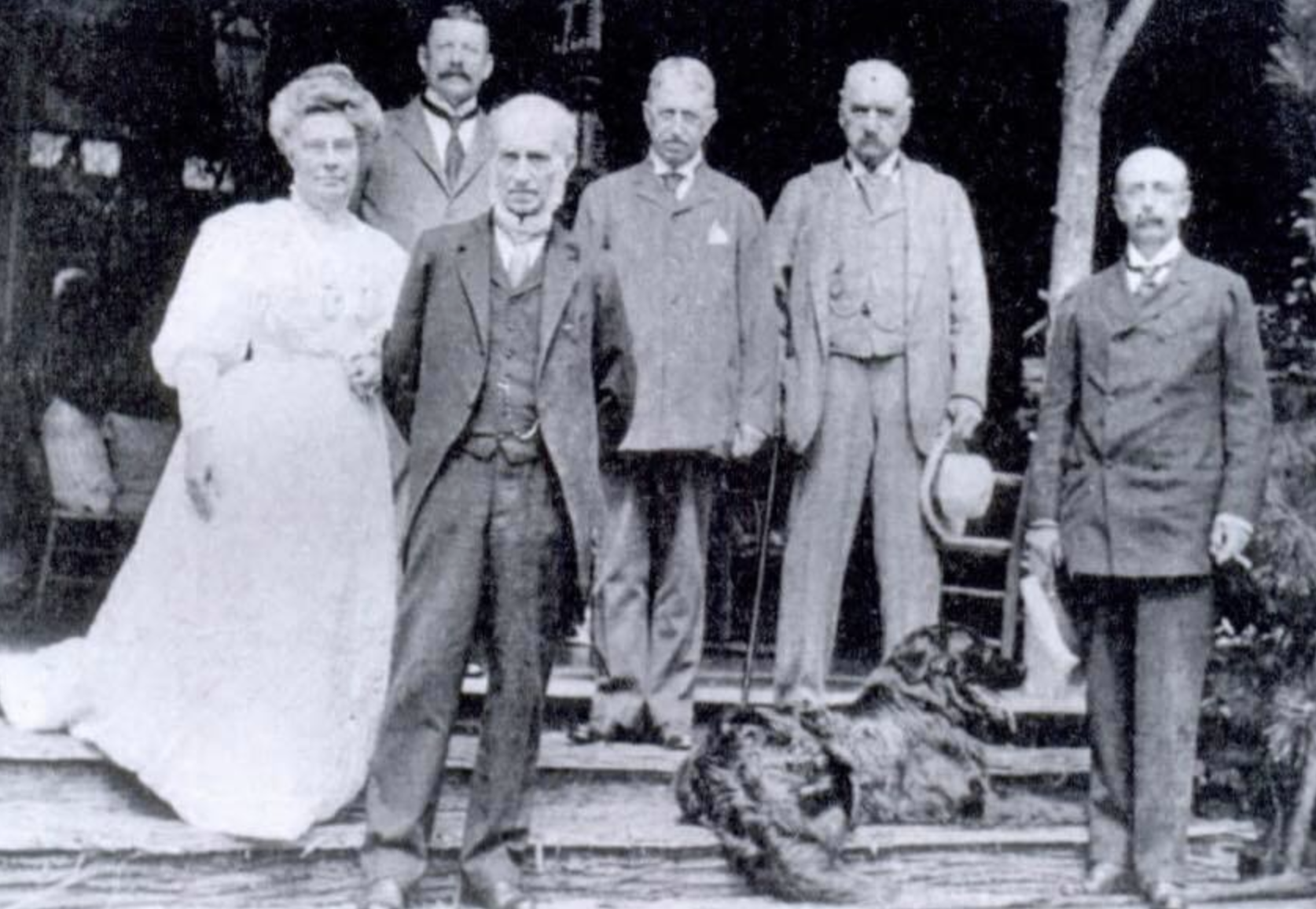
The Mills family with Whitelaw Reid and J. P. Morgan at the Millbrae estate (present-day Millbrae, California) c. 1890

Mills bought part of Rancho Buri Buri from José de la Cruz Sánchez and built an estate named Millbrae (also known as the Mills estate and the Mills mansion), which gave its name to the present town that grew up around it. The estate took three years to build and was an imposing three-story structure featuring 42 rooms, a conservatory, a carriage house, a gatekeepers house, three artificial lakes, a dairy farm, 37,000 acres of land (at its peak), and various manicured gardens. Due to a large fire, the estate burned down in June 1954.

After the fire the estate was subdivided and sold, with the bulk of the land going to the Paul W. Trousdale Construction Company in 1953 and eventually becoming Mills High School, Spring Valley Elementary School, and Peninsula Hospital. The 150 acres (0.6 km^{2}) of the original estate bordering San Francisco Bay were leased by his grandson Ogden L. Mills to be used for Mills Field, now known as San Francisco International Airport.

== Personal life ==
On September 5, 1854, he married Jane Templeton Cunningham (1832–1888), the daughter of Elizabeth Griffiths (1809–1869) and Scottish born James C. Cunningham (1801–1870), who was a pioneer and shipowner. Together, they had a son and a daughter:

- Ogden Mills (1856–1929), who married Ruth T. Livingston (1855–1920), granddaughter of Maturin Livingston
- Elisabeth Mills (1857–1931), who married Whitelaw Reid (1837–1912), the U.S. Ambassador to Great Britain.

=== Death and legacy ===
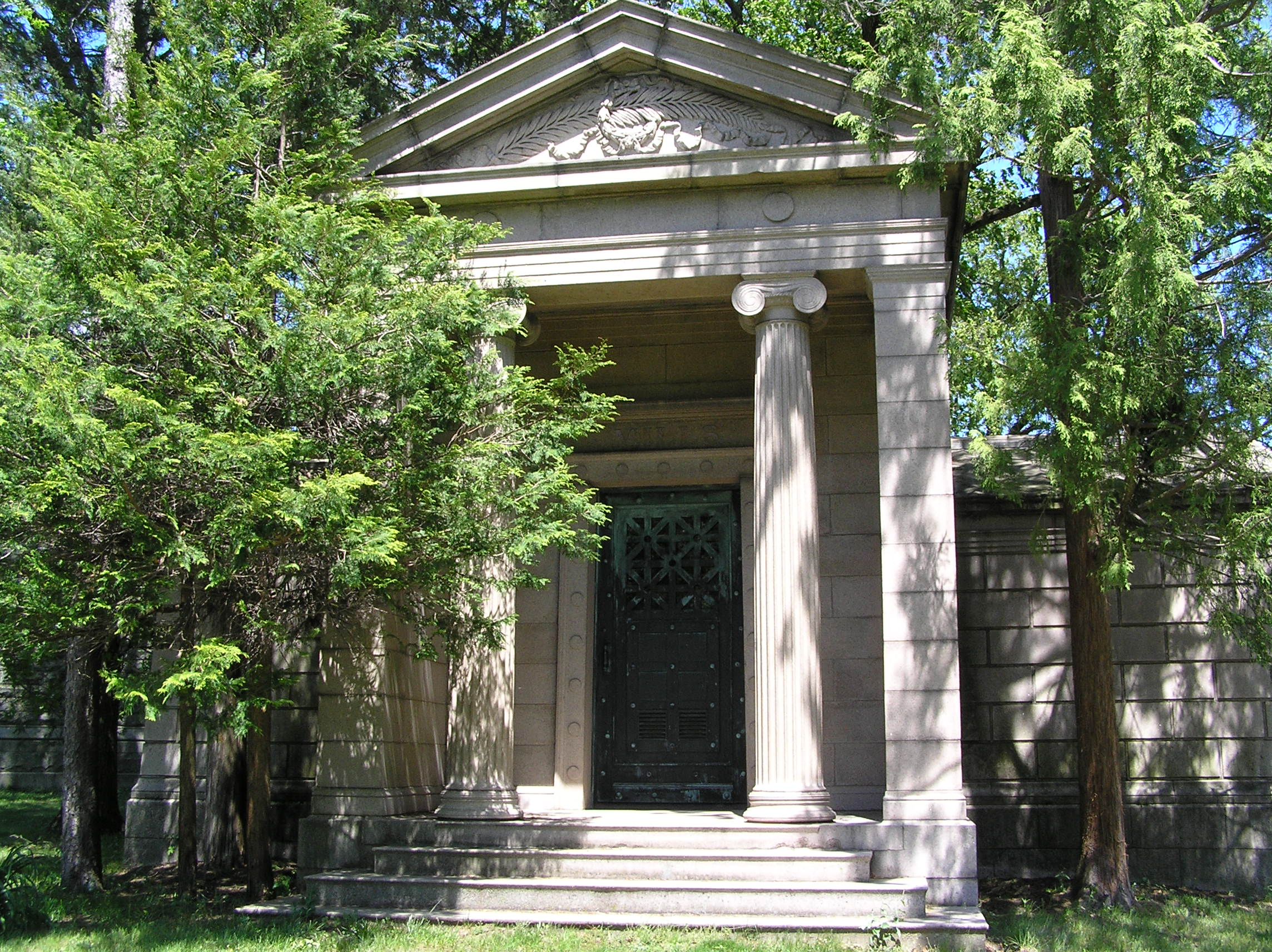
The mausoleum of Darius Ogden Mills, in Sleepy Hollow Cemetery

He died of a heart attack in 1910 at his Millbrae home, leaving an estate worth $36,227,391 (~$879 million in 2024). His remains were returned to the East Coast for burial in the Sleepy Hollow Cemetery in Sleepy Hollow, New York.

A number of local institutions are named for him, include Isabella I of Castile Mills Hospital, the Mills Estate housing subdivision, San Francisco's Mills Building, and Mills High School. The city of Millbrae, California, is named after his estate. The San Francisco airport was formerly named Mills Field, after him.

The California State Capitol rotunda houses a statue donated by Mills that depicts Queen Isabella financing Christopher Columbus's initial voyage.
