= Mills House No. 1 =

Building in Manhattan, New York

Coordinates: 40.7284°N 74.0002°W

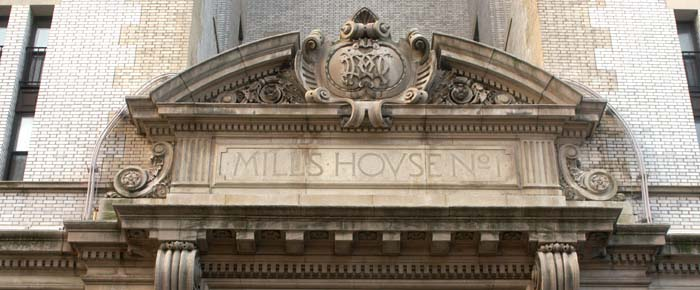
Detail of Mills House No. 1, now The Atrium

Mills House No. 1 or the Mills Hotel at 160 Bleecker Street in Greenwich Village, Manhattan, New York City was built as a hotel for poor men. It was funded by banker Darius Ogden Mills and designed by Ernest Flagg and opened in 1897. The building is now The Atrium.

== Description ==
Mills House No. 1 is one of two survivors of three men's hotels built by banker Darius Ogden Mills in New York City (the other being Mills House No. 3). It originally contained 1,554 tiny rooms (7 and a half by 6 feet or 5 by 8 feet) that rented at the affordable rate of 20 cents a night, with meals costing 15 cents, The rooms contained only a bed with a mattress and two pillows, one stuffed with hair, the other with feathers, a chair and a clothes rack, and their walls stopped about a foot short of the ceiling. There were four toilets and six washbasins on each floor (for 162 rooms) and bathrooms on the ground floor.

The building extends along Bleecker Street from Sullivan to Thompson streets, occupying four city lots. It was constructed on the site of a row of formerly fashionable houses called Depauw Row, which had become tenements. It cost $1.25 million to build and has eleven stories; two 100-foot (30 m) air shafts or light wells, 50 feet (15 m) square, capped by skylights, enabled each room to have a window and correspond to the provisions of the 1879 Tenement House Law known as the "Old Law"; the architect, Ernest Flagg, was an advocate for housing reform who had urged these requirements. The layout of the building may have been inspired by the layout of The Dakota (1884), or by apartment buildings he had seen in Paris.

=== Similar buildings ===
It was the prototype of the philanthropic hotel movement, although Mills emphasized that his hotels were run efficiently so as to make a modest profit for investors and "[not to offend] the pride or praiseworthy independence of those I serve." It had its grand opening on November 1, 1897, the same day as the Astoria Hotel; Mills House No. 2, with 600 similar rooms, opened a few months later on Rivington Street at Chrystie Street on the Lower East Side. Mills House No. 3, which opened in 1907 with somewhat larger rooms and somewhat higher prices, still stands at 485 Seventh Avenue, at the northeast corner of 36th Street.

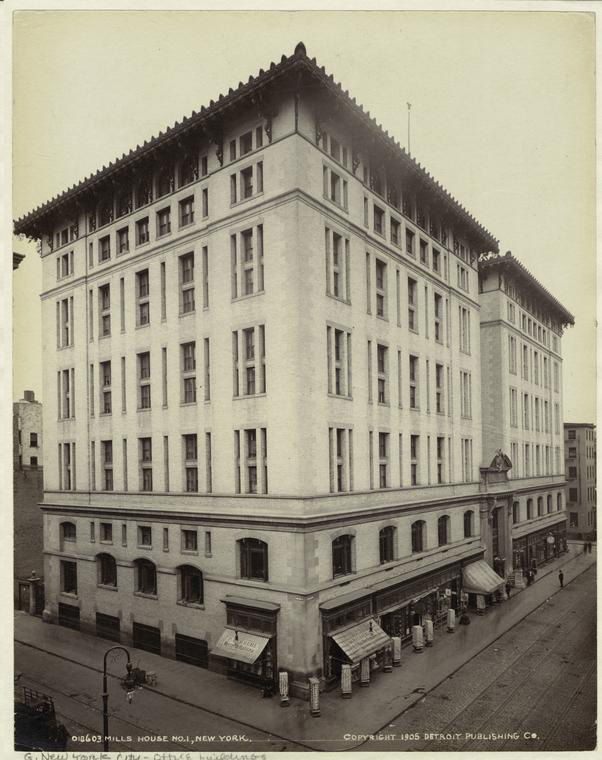
Mills House No. 1 in 1905

Mills said he was inspired by the Rowton Houses in London, but wanted to improve on them by providing something less like a lodging house. Mills House hotels were closed during the day to encourage residents to seek work. Guests could not gain entry after midnight and were required to pay in advance; they were refused entry, even if they had prepaid, if they were drunk. Amenities included a library, and guests could also use a network of lounges. In 1902, Jacob A. Riis included the Mills Houses in his book The Battle with the Slum.

== Operation and use ==
Mills House No. 1 was operated by a family trust after Mills' death until 1949, when it was sold and became the Greenwich Hotel; it remained for men only. By the 1960s, it became the first hotel in New York to be called a "welfare hotel". Some remembered it as "a mean flop house [where] winos and junkies could get a room ... for $2 a night" and where someone was once killed by a table that had been thrown out of a window. The jazz club The Village Gate operated from 1958 to 1994 in the former laundry in the basement of the building and later also on upper floors.

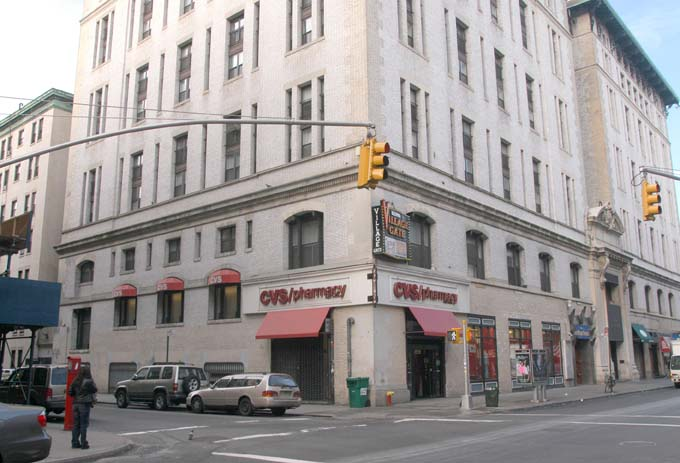
The Atrium in 2006

In the early 1960s, the building was to have been converted into artists' and students' housing with theatre facilities under the name Renaissance House.

In the mid-1970s, the building was gut-renovated and converted into an apartment house, named The Atrium for the covered courtyards. In the 1980s, the apartments were converted to a housing cooperative; in the mid-1990s, the exterior was renovated. There are 194 apartments, and some furnished suites available for short-term rental. The Village Gate space became a CVS Pharmacy with (Le) Poisson Rouge located below.

Mills House No. 1 was planned to be designated as a landmark by the New York City Landmarks Preservation Commission in 1967, but the owner's lawyer objected.
