= Phipps–McElveen Building =

- U.S. National Register of Historic Places
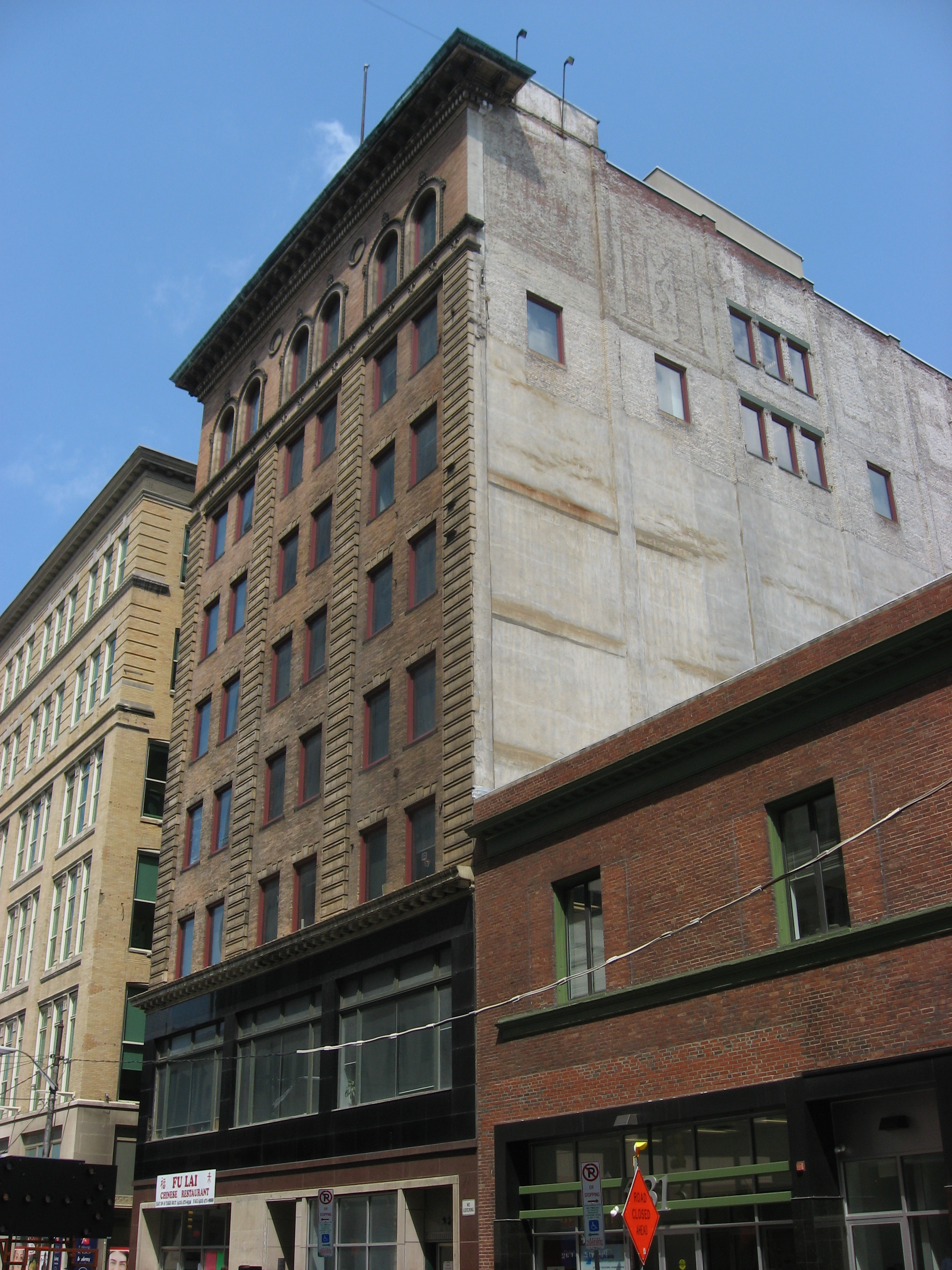

- Location within Pittsburgh Location within Pennsylvania Location within the United States
- Location: 525–529 Penn Avenue (Downtown Pittsburgh), Pittsburgh, Pennsylvania
- Coordinates: 40°26′34″N 80°0′10″W
- Built: 1896
- Architectural style: Renaissance Revival, Early Commercial
- NRHP reference No.: 00000451
- Added to NRHP: May 5, 2000

The Phipps–McElveen Building at 525–529 Penn Avenue in downtown Pittsburgh, Pennsylvania, United States.

== History ==
The building was built in 1896 by Henry Phipps Jr., an early business partner of Andrew Carnegie, real estate developer, and philanthropist.

The building served as the location of the McElveen furniture store for about 20 years. By 1919 it was occupied by a clothier, Oppenhiem, Collins & Company, who stayed there until the late 1930s.

Thereafter it was occupied by Walgreens, another furniture store, and a recreation center.

The building was added to the National Register of Historic Places on May 5, 2000.

== See also ==
- National Register of Historic Places in Pittsburgh
