= William C. Trimble =

American Diplomat

William Cattell Trimble (born May 2, 1907, Baltimore, Maryland; died June 24, 1996, Brooklandville, Maryland) was an American diplomat who began his career as a vice consul in Seville, Spain in 1931 and finished it in 1968 as Deputy Assistant Secretary of State for African Affairs. He was the United States Ambassador to Cambodia from 1959 to 1962.

Trimble graduated from the Gilman School in 1926 and Princeton University in 1930.

While working at the embassy in Paris in the era of Kristallnacht, he needed to arrange for many American tourists to return home as well as relocate German Jews who had fled to France.
