= Ogden Mills Phipps =

American financier and racehorse owner (1940–2016)

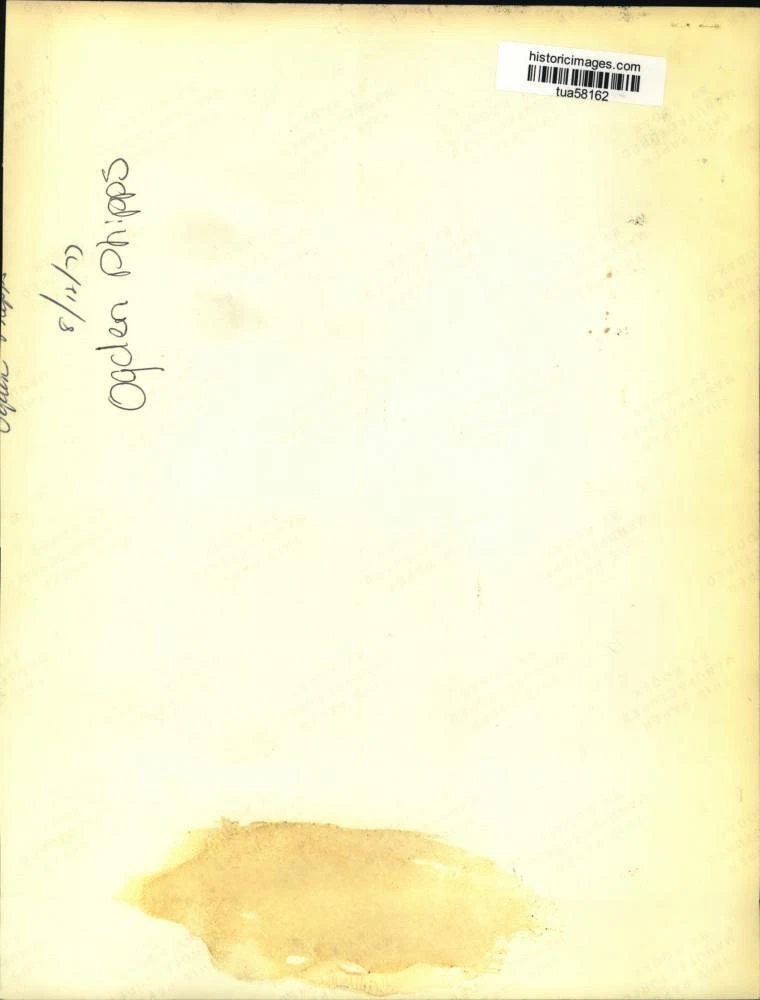
- Phipps in 1977
- Born: September 18, 1940; New York City, U.S.
- Died: April 6, 2016 (aged 75); New York City, U.S.
- Education: Yale University
- Occupations: Financier, Racehorse owner/breeder & industry executive
- Political party: Republican
- Board member of: The Jockey Club, NYRA, Breeders' Cup Limited, NTRA
- Spouse: Andrea (Ande) Phipps (m. 1970)
- Children: 6
- Parent(s): Ogden Phipps & Lillian Stokes Bostwick
- Honors: Eclipse Award of Merit (1978); New York Turf Writers Award (1978); TOBA Industry Service Award (2002); Racing Hall of Fame Pillar of the Turf (2017)

Ogden Mills "Dinny" Phipps (September 18, 1940 – April 6, 2016) was an American financier, thoroughbred racehorse industry executive, and horse breeder. Widely known by the nickname "Dinny," he was chairman of the family's Bessemer Trust until retiring in 1994, and served as its vice chairman. Additionally, he served as a board member of several horse-racing organizations.

== Early life ==
Ogden Mills Phipps was the son of major Thoroughbred breeder Ogden Phipps and Lillian Bostwick Phipps. His grandmother Gladys Mills Phipps owned the renowned Wheatley Stable and his great-grandfather Ogden Mills was involved with Thoroughbreds starting at the end of the 19th century. Ogden Mills owned racing stables in the United States and was a partner with Lord Derby in a racing stable in France.

== Career ==
=== Horse racing industry executive ===
A member of the board of directors and a past chairman of The Jockey Club and of the New York Racing Association, Phipps was a member of the Jockey Club of Canada. He also served on the board of Breeders' Cup Limited and the National Thoroughbred Racing Association and, with his cousin Stuart S. Janney III, co-owned Orb, the 2013 Kentucky Derby winner.

=== Thoroughbred racing ===
Like their father and grandmother before them, Dinny Phipps and his sister Cynthia had a long working relationship with the Hancock family's Claiborne breeding farm near Paris, Kentucky. In 1995, Dinny Phipps's great filly Inside Information won the Molly Pitcher Handicap, following his sister Cynthia who won it in 1992 with Versailles Treaty, and his father Ogden who had also won it in 1988 with Personal Ensign.

Dinny Phipps and his father were two of the subjects in the 2003 book Legacies of the Turf: A Century of Great Thoroughbred Breeders by race historian Edward L. Bowen that chronicled the history of Thoroughbred racing's most influential breeders. In 1978 Dinny Phipps received the Eclipse Award of Merit, the horse racing industry's highest honor, plus he was voted the New York Turf Writers Award as "The Man Who Did the Most for Racing." In 2002, Phipps received the Industry Service Award from the Thoroughbred Owners and Breeders Association.

Among the many successful horses raced by Dinny Phipps were:

- Rhythm (b. 1987) – 1989 American Champion Two-Year-Old Colt, won the 1989 Breeders' Cup Juvenile;
- Dispute (b. 1990) – a winner of four Grade 1 races including the Kentucky Oaks;
- Inside Information (b. 1991) – 1995 American Champion Older Female Horse, won the 1995 Breeders' Cup Distaff, 2008 U.S. Racing Hall of Fame inductee;
- Storm Flag Flying (b. 2000) – voted the 2002 American Champion Two-Year-Old Filly, won the 2002 Breeders' Cup Juvenile Fillies;
- Pleasant Home (b. 2001) – won the 2005 Breeders' Cup Distaff;
- Smuggler (b. 2002) – voted the 2005 American Champion Three-Year-Old Filly.
- Orb (b. 2010) – won the 2013 Kentucky Derby.

In partnership with William S. Farish III, Dinny Phipps bred Storm Song, the 1996 Breeders' Cup Juvenile Fillies winner and American Champion Two-Year-Old Filly. In England, Dinny Phipps' horse, Posse, won the 1980 G1 Sussex Stakes and G2 St. James's Palace Stakes and went on to sire Group 1 winners.

In 2017, he was inducted into the National Museum of Racing and Hall of Fame as a Pillar of the Turf.

== Personal life and death ==
Phipps had six children and 24 grandchildren, including namesake Ogden Phipps. He and his wife of 46 years, Andrea (Ande), had four children. Dinny died on April 6, 2016, at the age of 75, and Andrea died on July 28, 2026, at the age of 82.
