= Henry Phipps House =

Demolished mansion in Manhattan, New York

Coordinates: 40.78243°N 73.95968°W

The Henry Phipps House was a mansion located on 1063 Fifth Avenue on the Upper East Side of Manhattan, New York City.

It was constructed for Henry Phipps Jr. and demolished after his death in 1930. The entire marble facade was relocated by his widow to their daughter Amy's country estate, Templeton, in Brookville, New York. Parts of the marble were repurposed to renovate Templeton in 2013.
