= Gladys Mills Phipps =

American socialite and horse owner (1883–1970)

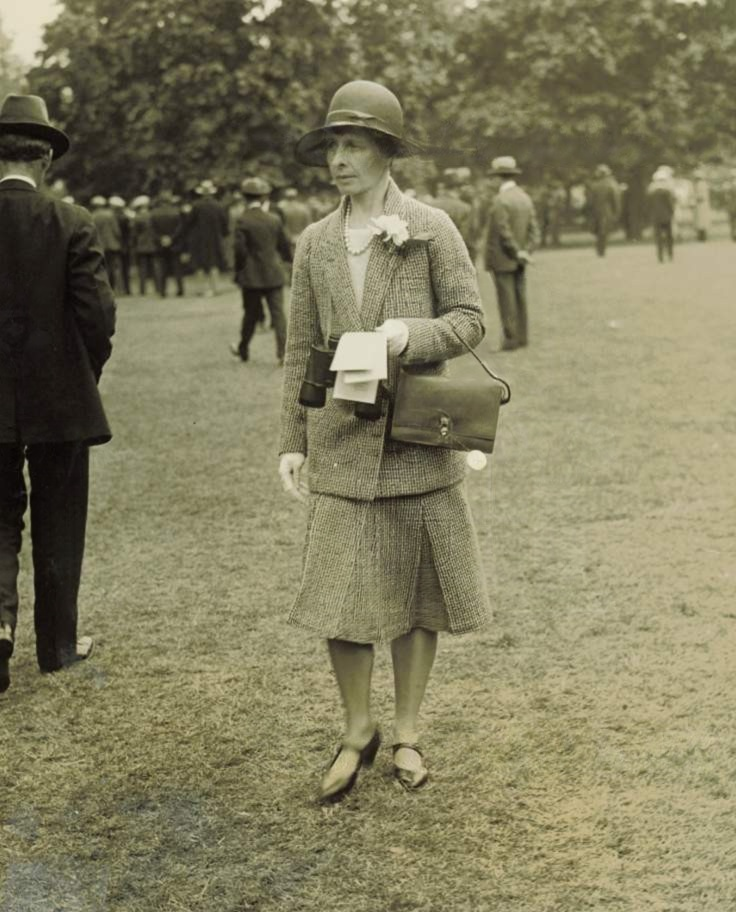
- Mills c. 1930
- Born: Gladys Mills; June 19, 1883; Newport, Rhode Island, U.S.
- Died: October 19, 1970 (aged 87); Roslyn, New York, U.S.
- Occupation: Racehorse owner/breeder
- Known for: "First Lady of The Turf"
- Spouse: Henry Carnegie Phipps (m. 1907; died 1953)
- Children: 4, including Ogden Phipps
- Parent(s): Ogden Mills; Ruth T. Livingston
- Relatives: Beatrice Mills (sister); Ogden L. Mills (brother)
- Awards: National Museum of Racing and Hall of Fame, inducted 2019

Gladys Mills Phipps (June 19, 1883 – October 19, 1970) was an American socialite, sportsperson, and a thoroughbred racehorse owner and breeder who began the Phipps family dynasty in American horse racing. She was known as the "first lady of the turf".

== Early life ==
Gladys Mills was born in Newport, Rhode Island on June 19, 1883, to Ruth Livingston (1855–1920) and Ogden Mills (1856–1929). She had a twin sister, Beatrice, Countess Granard (1883–1972), and a brother, Ogden Livingston Mills (1884–1937) who served as the United States Secretary of the Treasury.

Mills Phipps was an avid ice skater and an excellent golfer; she won a number of tournaments, including a match play championship at the Newport, Rhode Island, golf course in which she beat her male counterparts. She was, however, first and foremost a lover of horses. Her father had owned racing stables in the United States and in France. Her twin, Beatrice, would inherit the French stable and become a leading owner in that country.

== Horse racing ==
Gladys Phipps became involved in the sport of Thoroughbred racing when a neighbor, Harry Payne Whitney gave her the pick of five of his yearlings to start a racing stable. She and her brother Ogden L. Mills established the highly successful Wheatley Stable in 1926. Both of her children became involved in thoroughbred horse racing.

Mills Phipps had her first winner on February 4, 1926, when her filly Sturdy Stella won in Miami. Her love of horses and racing would last throughout her life. After her husband's death in 1953, she would continue to manage Wheatley Stable until her death in 1970. Phipps was said to be most happy during her morning hours at the racetrack, where she would watch her horses exercise, accompanied by two pet poodles.

Throughout her time as an owner, she bred, or co-bred 102 stakes winners, including Bold Ruler. In 2019, she was named to the National Museum of Racing and Hall of Fame.

== Personal life ==
In 1907, Gladys Mills married Henry Carnegie Phipps (1879–1953), son of the wealthy Pittsburgh, Pennsylvania, businessman, Henry Phipps Jr. Together they had:

- Ogden Phipps (1908–2002), who was married to Ruth Pruyn (1907–1994), and later, Lillian Stokes Bostwick (1906–1987)
- Barbara Phipps (1911–1987), who married Stuart Symington Janney Jr. (1907–1988). They were the parents of Stuart S. Janney III
- Audrey Phipps (1915-1992), who was married to Philip Dana Holden (d. 1973), an investment banker
- Sonia Phipps (1919–2006), who was married to Hans Christoph Farrell, Count of Seherr-Thoss (1912–1992).

Gladys Mills Phipps died on October 19, 1970, in Roslyn, New York.

=== Philanthropy ===
Following her brother's death in 1937, Gladys Mills Phipps inherited their parents' mansion at Staatsburg, New York. In 1938, she gave the house and 192 acres (0.78 km^{2}) to the State of New York.
