= Venture Capital Journal =

American business magazine

- Editor: Lawrence Aragon
- Categories: Trade magazine
- Frequency: Bi-monthly
- Founded: 1961
- Company: PEI Group
- Country: United States
- Language: English
- Website: www.venturecapitaljournal.com

Venture Capital Journal (VCJ) is a monthly glossy magazine that covers investment trends, financing techniques and news from across the Venture Capital industry. The magazine, founded in 1961, focuses on venture capital and features expert analysis and commentary. Top venture capitalists who have been featured in VCJ include Jim Breyer, Steve Westly, John Doerr, William Henry Draper III, Timothy C. Draper, Pitch Johnson, Vinod Khosla, Ray Lane, Michael Moritz, Tom Perkins Lip-Bu Tan, Arthur Rock, Heidi Roizen, Paul Wythes, and Don Valentine.

The journal was acquired by UCG from Thomson Reuters in 2014. UCG sold VCJ to Simplify Compliance, a portfolio company of Leeds Equity Partners, in 2016.

VCJ has since been acquired by PEI Group who increased the size of VCJ’s editorial team, expanding its geographical coverage.
