= Ogden Mills (financier) =

American businessman

- Born: December 18, 1856; Sacramento, California, US
- Died: January 29, 1929 (aged 72); New York City, US
- Resting place: St. James Churchyard, Hyde Park, New York
- Occupations: Businessman, philanthropist, racehorse owner/breeder
- Spouse: Ruth T. Livingston (m. 1882; died 1920)
- Children: Gladys, Beatrice, Ogden
- Parent(s): Darius Ogden Mills; Jane Templeton Cunningham
- Relatives: Elisabeth Mills Reid (sister); Whitelaw Reid (brother-in-law)

Ogden Mills (December 18, 1856 – January 29, 1929) was an American financier and Thoroughbred racehorse owner.

== Early life ==
Ogden Mills was born on December 18, 1856, in Sacramento, California, to Jane Templeton Cunningham and Darius Ogden Mills (1825–1910). His father was a highly successful banker and investor who, upon his death in 1910, left Ogden Mills and his sister, Elisabeth Mills, who married Whitelaw Reid, an estate valued at $36,227,391. As a result of his father's many corporate investments, Ogden Mills served on the Board of Directors of a number of companies including the New York Central Railroad.

== Thoroughbred racing ==
A member of The Jockey Club, Ogden Mills raced horses in the United States and maintained a racing stable in France in partnership with Lord Derby. Among their successes in that country, they won the 1928 Grand Prix de Paris with the colt Cri de Guerre, bred by Evremond de Saint-Alary. On his death in 1929, Ogden Mills left to his daughter Beatrice, a resident of London, England, married to Bernard Forbes, 8th Earl of Granard, his French racing stable and a home at 73 Rue de Varenne in Paris. That year, Beatrice led all French owners in purses earned.

In 1926, Mills' daughter Gladys and son Ogden established Wheatley Stable, which became one of the preeminent racing and breeding operations in American racing history.

== Personal life ==
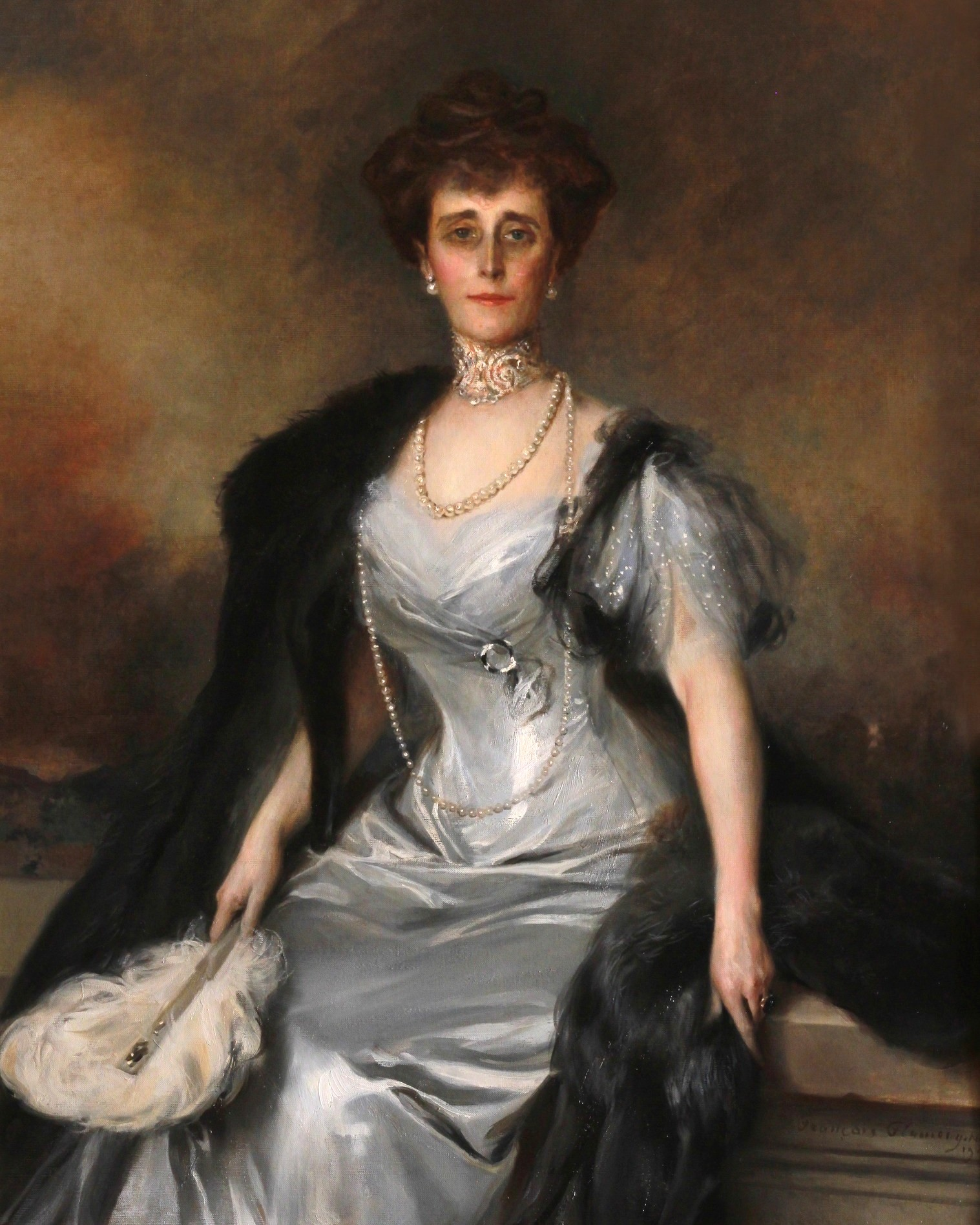
Portrait of Ogden's wife, Ruth Livingston Mills, by François Flameng

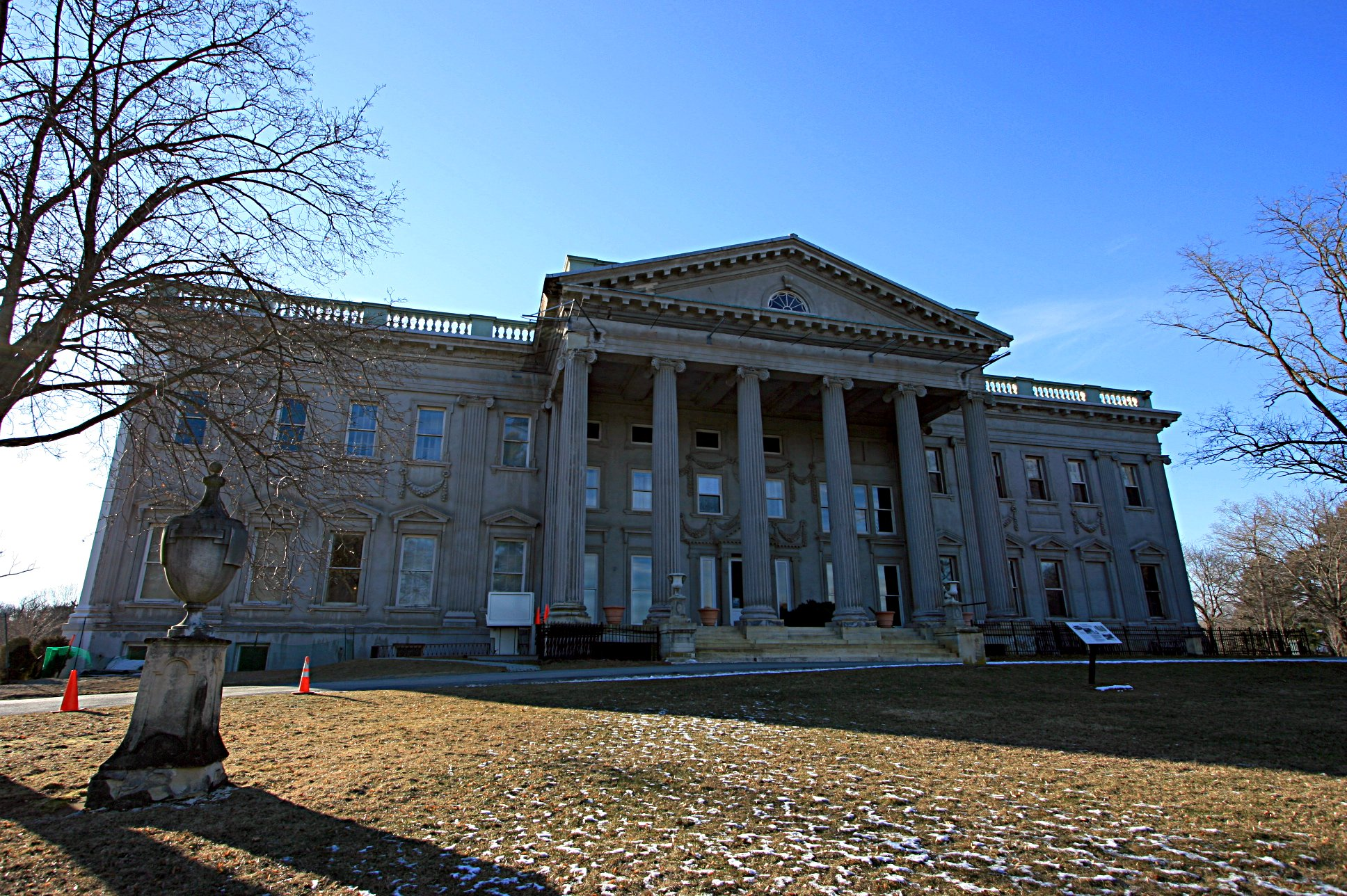
The Livingston mansion, the country home of the Mills family.

In 1882, Ogden Mills married Ruth T. Livingston (1855–1920), daughter of Maturin Livingston Jr. and Ruth Baylies a descendant of Thomas Baylies (1687–1756). She was the twin sister of Elizabeth Livingston (1855–1943), who was married to William George Cavendish-Bentinck (1854–1909). She was also the granddaughter of Maturin Livingston (1769–1847) and Margaret Lewis (1780–1860), who was the only daughter and sole heiress of Gov. Morgan Lewis (1754–1844). Together, Ogden and Ruth Mills had three children, twin daughters and a son:

- Gladys Livingston Mills (1883–1970), who married Henry Carnegie Phipps (1879–1953) in 1907
- Jane Beatrice Mills (1883–1972), who married Bernard Forbes, 8th Earl of Granard (1874–1948) in 1909
- Ogden Livingston Mills (1884–1937), who became the 50th United States Secretary of the Treasury in 1932, and married Margaret Stuyvesant Rutherfurd in 1911. After their divorce in 1919, he married Dorothy Randolph Fell, former wife of the banker John R. Fell, in 1924.

Ruth Livingston Mills inherited the Livingston mansion in Staatsburg, New York, which the couple used as a summer home and where they raised horses. She died at their residence in Paris, France, on October 13, 1920.

Ogden Mills died of pneumonia on January 29, 1929, at the family home in New York City. He was buried with his wife at the mausoleum in St. James's Cemetery in Hyde Park, New York.

=== Philanthropy ===
Like his father, Ogden Mills was involved in a number of charitable causes and the Ogden Mills & Ruth Livingston Mills State Park encompasses their mansion at Staatsburg, New York, that is now Staatsburgh State Historic Site.

Mills was instrumental in assisting the State of New York in placing a statue of Robert R. Livingston, his wife's great-great-great-grandfather, in the National Statuary Hall Collection in Washington, D.C., highlighting him as one of the state's two most illustrious citizens.

=== Descendants ===
Through his eldest daughter, he was the grandfather of Barbara Phipps Janney and Ogden Phipps (1908–2002), and the great-grandfather of Ogden Mills Phipps (1940–2016) and Cynthia Phipps (1945-2007), also major figures in horse racing.
