= Beatrice Forbes, Countess of Granard =

American heiress and horse racer (1883–1972)

The Right Honourable The Countess of Granard
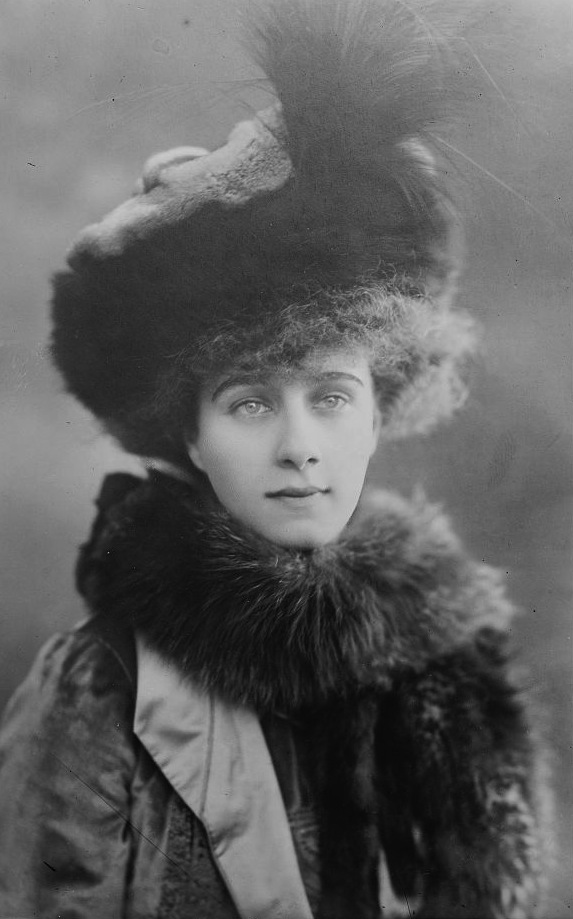
- Countess Beatrice, c. 1910

Personal details
- Born: Jane Beatrice Mills; July 19, 1883 Newport, Rhode Island, U.S.
- Died: January 30, 1972 (aged 88) Paris, France
- Spouse: Bernard, Earl of Granard (m. 1909; died 1948)
- Children: 4, including Arthur, Earl of Granard
- Parent(s): Ogden Mills; Ruth Livingston Mills
- Relatives: Gladys Mills Phipps (sister); Ogden L. Mills (brother); Jean Templeton Ward (cousin)
- Occupation: Heiress, racehorse owner/breeder

Jane Beatrice Forbes, Countess of Granard (née Mills; July 19, 1883 – January 30, 1972) was an American-born heiress, social leader, and thoroughbred horse racer.

== Early life ==
She was born on 19 July 1883 in Newport, Rhode Island to some of the most prominent and wealthy American families. She was the daughter of the American financier Ogden Mills and Ruth (née Livingston) Mills (1855–1920). She was a twin to Gladys Mills (who married Henry Carnegie Phipps) and sister of Ogden Livingston Mills, the United States Secretary of the Treasury who married Margaret Styuvesant Rutherfurd (daughter of Anne Harriman and Lewis Morris Rutherfurd Jr.)

Her maternal grandparents were Maturin Livingston Jr. and Ruth (née Baylies) Livingston a descendant of Thomas Baylies. Her aunt, Elizabeth Livingston Cavendish-Bentinck, was married to William George Cavendish-Bentinck, a Member of Parliament for Penryn and Falmouth and descendant of the Dukes of Portland. Her paternal grandparents were Jane Templeton Cunningham and Darius Ogden Mills, a highly successful banker and investor worth over $36 million at his death. Her aunt, Elisabeth Mills, was married to Whitelaw Reid, the U.S. Ambassador to Great Britain. Through her aunt, she was the first cousin of Jean Templeton Reid, who married Sir John Hubert Ward, son of the Earl of Dudley.

== Thoroughbred racing ==
Beatrice Mills was raised around horses at her family's Livingston Mansion in Staatsburg, New York. Her father owned Thoroughbred racehorses in the United States and in France in partnership with Edward, Earl of Derby. Beatrice's sister Gladys and her brother Ogden would establish Wheatley Stable that would become one of the preeminent Thoroughbred racing and breeding operations in the United States.

Beatrice's husband, Bernard, was Master of the Horse whose duties for King George V included overseer of the Royal Stables and Stud. On January 29, 1929, Beatrice's father died. As part of her inheritance she received his stable of Thoroughbreds in France. That year, she led all owners in purses earned.

In 1933, her horse, Cappiello, won the Prix Lupin and the prestigious Grand Prix de Paris at Longchamp Racecourse in Paris. Among her other racing successes, Lady Granard's horses won the Prix Jacques le Marois in 1937 and 1967. In 1964 her horse Pourparler won the British Classic, the 1,000 Guineas Stakes.

The most notable horse bred and raced by her siblings' Wheatley Stable in the United States was Bold Ruler, a U.S. Racing Hall of Fame inductee and an eight-time Leading sire in North America. Gladys and Ogden bred Bold Ruler to the Champion racing mare, Misty Morn. The result of the mating was Bold Lad, a colt born in 1962 that earned American Champion Two-Year-Old Colt honors. Bold Ruler sired a second colt in 1964 by a different mare that was given the same Bold Lad name. Bold Lad II was bred by Lady Granard and raced in England and Ireland where it too won Champion Two-Year-Old Colt honors.

== Personal life ==
On 14 January 1909, she married Bernard, Earl of Granard. With her marriage, Beatrice Mills would be known as Countess and/or Lady Granard. Her husband's wealth was limited and she provided the funds to finish restoring the family's historic Castleforbes in Newtownforbes, County Longford, Ireland. Their principal residence was at Forbes House, Halkin Street, SW1 in London, plus a residence at 73 Rue de Varenne, Paris, France, she would inherit from her father. Together, Beatrice and Bernard were the parents of four children:

- Lady Moira Mary Forbes (1910–1994); married Count Rossi of Switzerland.
- Lady Eileen Beatrice Forbes (1912–1993); married John Crichton-Stuart, 5th Marquess of Bute.
- Arthur Patrick Hastings Forbes, 9th Earl of Granard (1915–1992); married Princess Marie-Madeleine Eugénie de Faucigny-Lucinge.
- Hon. John Forbes (1920–1982); whose son later became the 10th Earl of Granard.

A widow for more than twenty-three years, Lady Granard died at her Paris residence on 30 January 1972. She was buried at St. Paul's, Newtown Forbes, County Longford, Ireland.
