= Bessemer Trust =

US domestic multi-family office

Bessemer Trust Company
- Type: Private
- Industry: Family office
- Founded: 1907; 119 years ago
- Founder: Henry Phipps Jr.
- Headquarters: International Building (moving to 1271 Avenue of the Americas in 2021), New York City, United States
- Owner: Phipps family
- Website: bessemertrust.com

Bessemer Trust is a private, independent multi-family office that oversees more than $200 billion for over 3,000 families, foundations and endowments. Founded in 1907, the firm has its headquarters in New York City, with 19 regional offices elsewhere in the world.

== History and family ownership ==
In 1907, Henry Phipps Jr. (1839–1930), of the Phipps family that still owns and directs the firm, started Bessemer Trust as a family office to manage money he earned from his sale of Carnegie Steel, which he founded with Andrew Carnegie.

Around 1920, Bessemer Trust for the Phipps family "provided not only investments but dog walking, maids and a private train to shuttle family members between New York and Florida." The Bessemer name was a reference to a steel-making process that had helped enrich the Phippses.

In 1974, the Phipps family began allowing other select wealthy families to use Bessemer Trust's family office capabilities. This allowed the firm to maintain the size required to attract potential staff and investments. In 2001, Bessemer Trust entered into a partnership with Morgan Stanley's Alan Goldberg to form Lindsay Goldberg & Bessemer, a middle market private equity firm. Prior to the founding of LGB, Bessemer Trust's Robert Lindsay was responsible for making private equity investments. Bessemer Trust won three notable awards in the 2014 Family Wealth Report, the yearly report from an organization that evaluates and ranks wealth management firms. The awards Bessemer Trust won include Best National Multi-Family Office and Best Fund Manager.

The current Chairman of the Board of Directors is the great-grandson of Henry Phipps, Stuart S. Janney III, who succeeded Ogden Mills Phipps in 1994. In 2018, Bessemer Trust leased the top seven floors at 1271 Avenue of the Americas in Manhattan, relocating from 630 Fifth Avenue in 2021. As of 2021, it managed around $100 billion in assets, including assets of celebrities such as Britney Spears. It asked to withdraw as the conservator to her estate in July 2021, stating it had not known of her objection to the conservatorship, after she publicly criticized the arrangement. As such, they withdrew from the role entirely. The request was accepted by a judge – Bessemer Trust had been appointed in November 2020 but had not yet started its duties or received any assets or fees.

As of December 31, 2020, the Bessemer Trust Company had a 401(k) plan in New Jersey of $520 million. As of 2021, Bessemer Trust remains a wealth management firm. In 2022, Bessemer Group Inc. operated two banks insured by the FDIC - Bessemer Trust Co. NA and Bessemer Trust Co. It also operated two direct US trust companies: Bessemer Trust Co. of Delaware NA and Bessemer Trust Co. of Florida.

== Company ==
Bessemer Trust's headquarters are in New York City. The firm has 18 regional offices located in Atlanta, Boston, Chicago, Dallas, Denver, Grand Cayman, Greenwich, Houston, Los Angeles, Miami, Naples, Palm Beach, San Francisco, Seattle, Stuart in Florida, Washington, D.C., Wilmington, and Woodbridge in New Jersey.

Bessemer Trust manages wealth totaling $106 billion, 90% of which comes from their 2,300 clients. With a client-retention rate of 98.4%, the firm holds on to significantly more of their clients than the industry-wide average of 95%. Clients must have at least $10 million to expect a full range of services from Bessemer Trust.
