= Henry Phipps Jr. =

American entrepreneur (1839–1930)

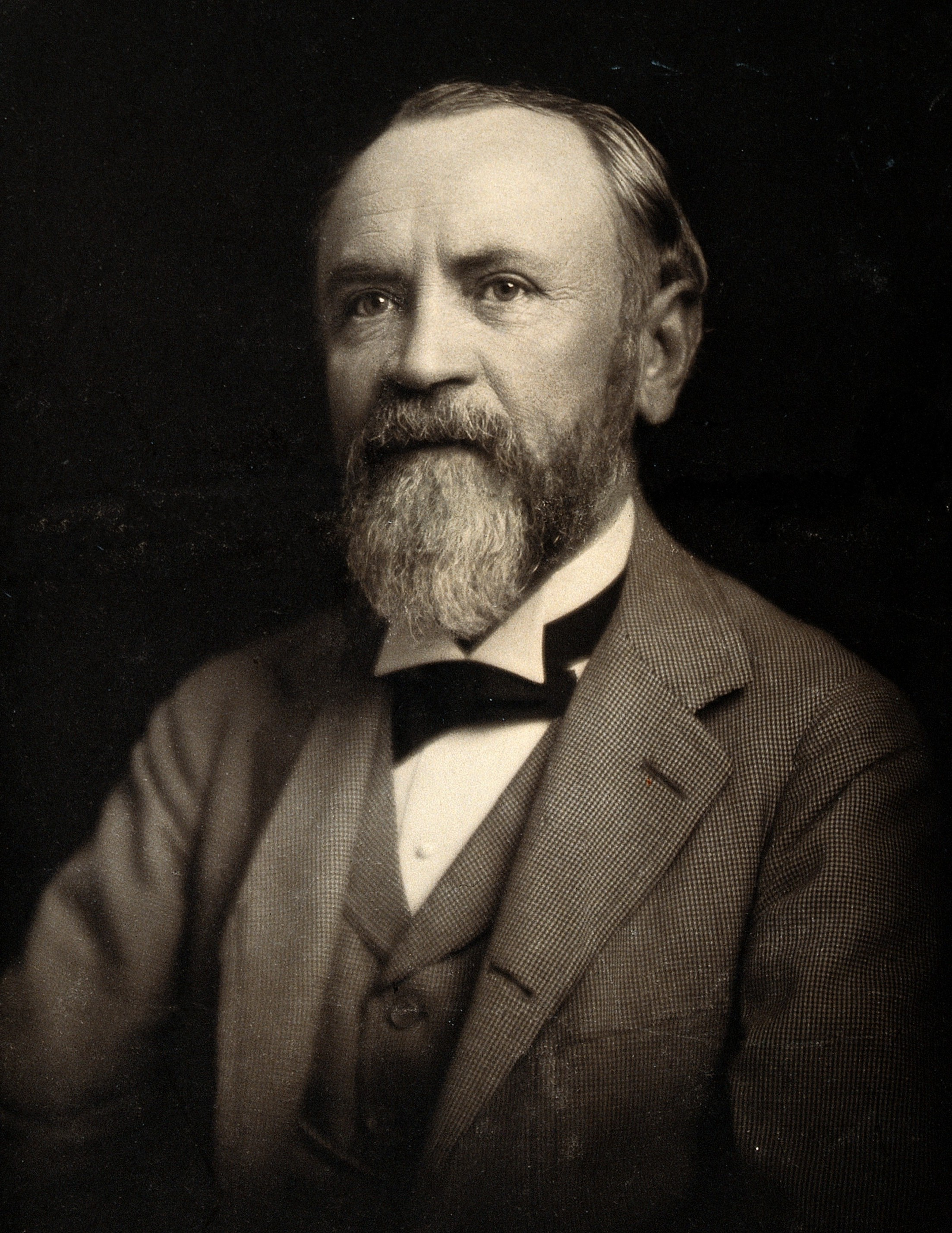
- Phipps in 1913
- Born: September 27, 1839; Philadelphia, Pennsylvania, US
- Died: September 22, 1930 (aged 90); Great Neck, Long Island, New York, US
- Known for: Co-founder of Carnegie Steel, philanthropy
- Board member of: Carnegie Steel Co. U.S. Steel Corporation
- Spouse: Anne Childs Shaffer (m. 1872)
- Children: 5, including John Shaffer Phipps & Henry Carnegie Phipps
- Family: Phipps

Henry Phipps Jr. (September 27, 1839 – September 22, 1930) was an American entrepreneur known for his business relationship with Andrew Carnegie and involvement with the Carnegie Steel Company. He was also a successful real estate investor. After selling his stock in Carnegie Steel, he devoted a great deal of his time and money to philanthropic works.

== Early life ==
Henry Phipps Jr. was born on September 27, 1839, in Philadelphia, Pennsylvania. His English parents, Henry Phipps, a shoemaker, and Hannah (née Franks), were married at Wolverhampton in 1824 and had at least one son born while they were still in England. William Henry Phipps was born on March 27, 1825 and baptized at Wellington, Shropshire, England, on August 18, 1830.

The family emigrated to Philadelphia by 1839. They later moved to Pittsburgh in 1845.

Phipps was educated at public schools in Allegheny City, Pennsylvania. He had two older brothers: William Henry Phipps (1825-1902), and John Phipps (1833-1860); and a younger sister, Amelia Phipps (Mrs. John Walker; 1846-1887), and who was also friends with Carnegie and who died young.

== Career ==
Phipps began working as a young man as an office boy and later a bookkeeper with Dillworth & Bidwell. In 1861, he became a partner in Bidwell & Phipps, which was an agent for the Du Pont Powder Company. He was also a partner in Kloman & Phipps, a small iron mill.

=== Involvement with Carnegie ===
In 1865, Phipps became a partner with childhood friends and neighbors Andrew (1835–1919) and Thomas Carnegie's (1843–1886) Union Iron Mills.

This was created by a merger between Phipps' Kloman & Phipps and Cyclops Iron Company, an iron company in which the Carnegies had acquired an interest. Kloman and Phipps at first refused, but Thomas Carnegie made an offer of all the shares in Cyclops plus an additional payment of $50,000 (equivalent to $1,052,000 in 2025). Therefore, on May 1, 1865, the new Union Iron Mills Company was formed.

For the next year, Phipps and Carnegie went to Europe on tour, and when they returned in 1866, went to work. Phipps toiled for the next 20 years and proved a capable financier, becoming Carnegie's business partner in Carnegie Steel Company, founded in 1892. He became a very wealthy man as the company's second-largest shareholder.

In 1901, Carnegie Steel Company was sold to the United States Steel Corporation, a newly formed organization, set up by Pierpont Morgan. It sold for $400 million (approx. $13.3 billion today), of which $226 million went to Carnegie himself, and $48 million went to Phipps.

In 1907, Henry Phipps established Bessemer Trust Company to manage his substantial assets. They would be shared by his children following his death (and, ultimately, that of his wife).

=== Real estate ===
In 1909, Phipps expanded his Cape Cod holdings to the entire 800-acre Great Island Yarmouth, Massachusetts, on Cape Cod. He purchased the remaining 50 acres from Charles B. Cory (1857–1921). The Cape Cod estate was next to Aberdeen Hall (which burnt down in September 1924) and was near the estates of Andrew Carnegie, Henry M. Flagler, and Henry Clay Frick, all friends and associates from Pittsburgh.

In 1912, Phipps divided $3,000,000 (equivalent to $100,086,000 in 2025) worth of real estate in Chicago, Illinois realty among his three sons. Later in the same year, he gave his sons $10,000,000 (equivalent to $333,621,000 in 2025) worth of property in Pittsburgh.

In 1916, he purchased property in Great Neck, Long Island in the Village of Lake Success. In 1917 he had construction begun there on a thirty-nine-room Georgian mansion summer home; it was completed in 1919. He named the home "Bonnie Blink", which is Scottish for "pretty view." After his death, the mansion and property were donated to the school district. The mansion became the administrative building for the district, and the William A. Shine Great Neck South High School and middle school were built on the estate.

In 1926, Phipps bought Island Beach, New Jersey. His heirs sold it in 1953 to the State of New Jersey. Now known as Island Beach State Park, it is the last remaining stretch of undeveloped barrier island on the central New Jersey coast.

Phipps was one of the pioneer investors in Florida real estate. At one time, he and his family owned one-third of the town of Palm Beach, 28 miles (approximately 45 kilometers) of oceanfront between Palm Beach and Fort Lauderdale, prime bayfront property in downtown Miami, and 29,653 acres (approximately 12,000 hectares) of land in Martin County. The Phipps family donated an ocean-to-lake property to the town of Palm Beach. This was one of the most significant gifts in county history; the property is now known as Phipps Park.

=== Philanthropy ===
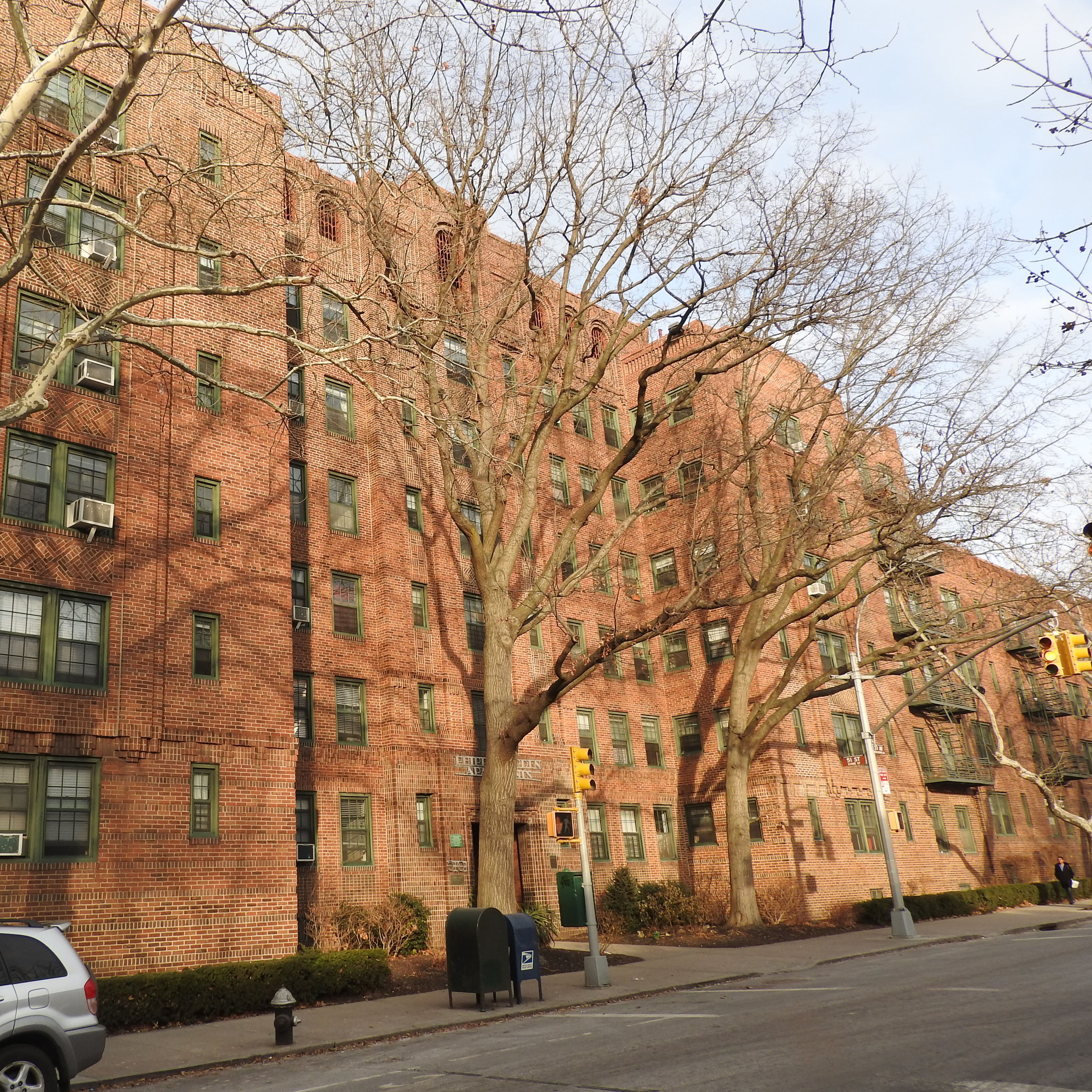
Phipps Houses, Queens, NYC

Phipps believed that those who have achieved great wealth should give back for the public good and create institutions dedicated to that purpose. He was involved with a number of philanthropic causes, the best known of which is the Phipps Conservatory and Botanical Gardens in Schenley Park, an 1893 gift to the city of Pittsburgh.

Among his many benevolent works, he also funded the Phipps Institute for the Study, Treatment and Prevention of Tuberculosis at the University of Pennsylvania.

Another major project was funding The Henry Phipps Psychiatric Clinic at Johns Hopkins Hospital. In 1913 this supported the first inpatient facility in the United States for care of the mentally ill that was constructed as part of an acute care hospital.

Phipps was an advocate for decent housing for the poor. In 1905 he funded the non-profit Phipps Houses to build affordable housing in New York City. He gave $1,000,000 (equivalent to $35,833,000 in 2025) to build tenement houses for "working people." Phipps Houses still operates to this day. Henry Phipps's great-grandson, Stuart S. Janney III, sits on its board of trustees.

He was instrumental in establishment of Indian Agricultural Research Institute in 1905 at Pusa, Bihar. Phipps was a family friend of Lady Curzon, who was a daughter of an American millionaire, and the wife of Lord Curzon, the Viceroy of India. Phipps stayed as a guest of the Curzons during his visit to India and left behind a donation of £30,000, which was used to establish the institute. He laid the foundation stone of the Agricultural Research Institute and college on April 1, 1905.

== Personal life ==
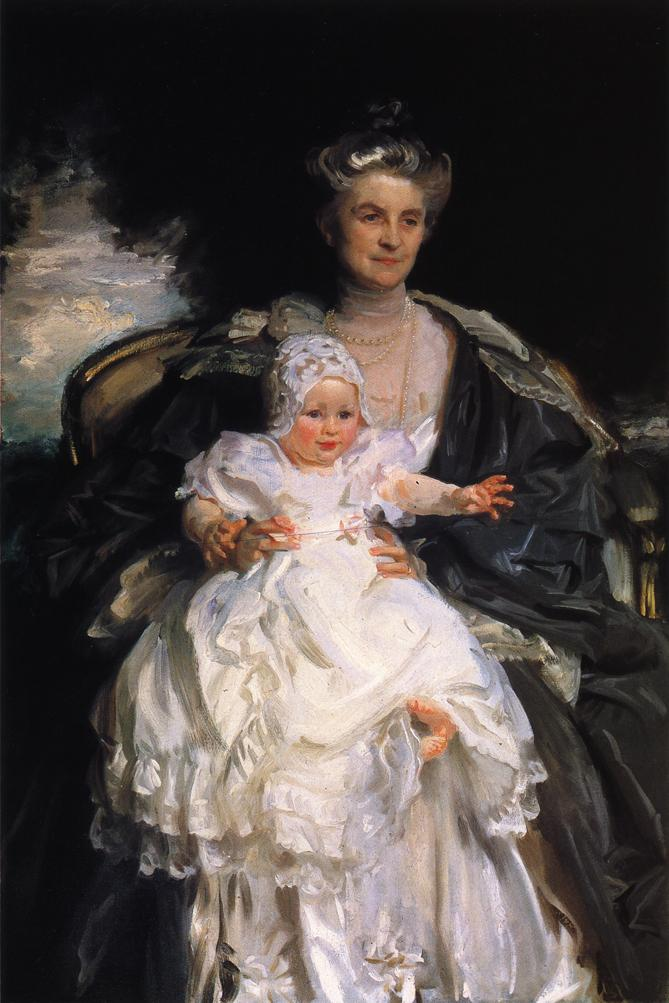
Mrs Henry Phipps and Her Grandson Winston, oil on canvas, John Singer Sargent, 1907

In 1872, Henry Phipps married Anne Childs Shaffer (1850–1934), the daughter of Margaret and John Shaffer, a Pittsburgh wagon builder. After their Bonnie Blink estate was completed in 1919, they spent their summers in Great Neck, Long Island. The couple had two daughters and three sons:

- Amy Phipps (1872–1959), who in 1905 married Frederick Edward Guest (1875–1937), the grandson of John Spencer-Churchill, 7th Duke of Marlborough and Winston Churchill's first cousin.
- John Shaffer Phipps (1874–1958), who in 1903 married Margarita Celia Grace, daughter of Michael P. Grace (1842–1920).
- Helen Margaret Phipps (1876–1934), who in 1904 married Bradley Martin Jr. (1873–1963) the son of Bradley Martin in Scotland, brother-in-law of William Craven, 4th Earl of Craven (1868–1921).
- Henry Carnegie Phipps (1879–1953), who in 1907 married Gladys Livingston Mills (1883–1970).
- Howard Phipps (1881–1981), who in 1931 married Harriet Dyer Price, daughter of Theodore Hazeltine Price and granddaughter of Alexander B. Dyer (1815–1874).

Phipps died in Great Neck, New York, on September 22, 1930, and his wife, Anne died in October 1934.

At his death, Phipps' estate was worth $3,121,810.32 (equivalent to $60,166,000 in 2025), according to transfer tax appraisal documents, of which $2,212,002 (equivalent to $42,632,000 in 2025) was in stocks and bonds, $926,679 (equivalent to $17,860,000 in 2025) was in properties, notes, cash and insurance bonds, and $375 in jointly owned property. His wife was the sole beneficiary of his estate according to his June 1, 1915, will.

== See also ==
- Phipps family
- Phipps-McElveen Building
- Henry Phipps House
