= Ogden L. Mills =

American politician (1884–1937)

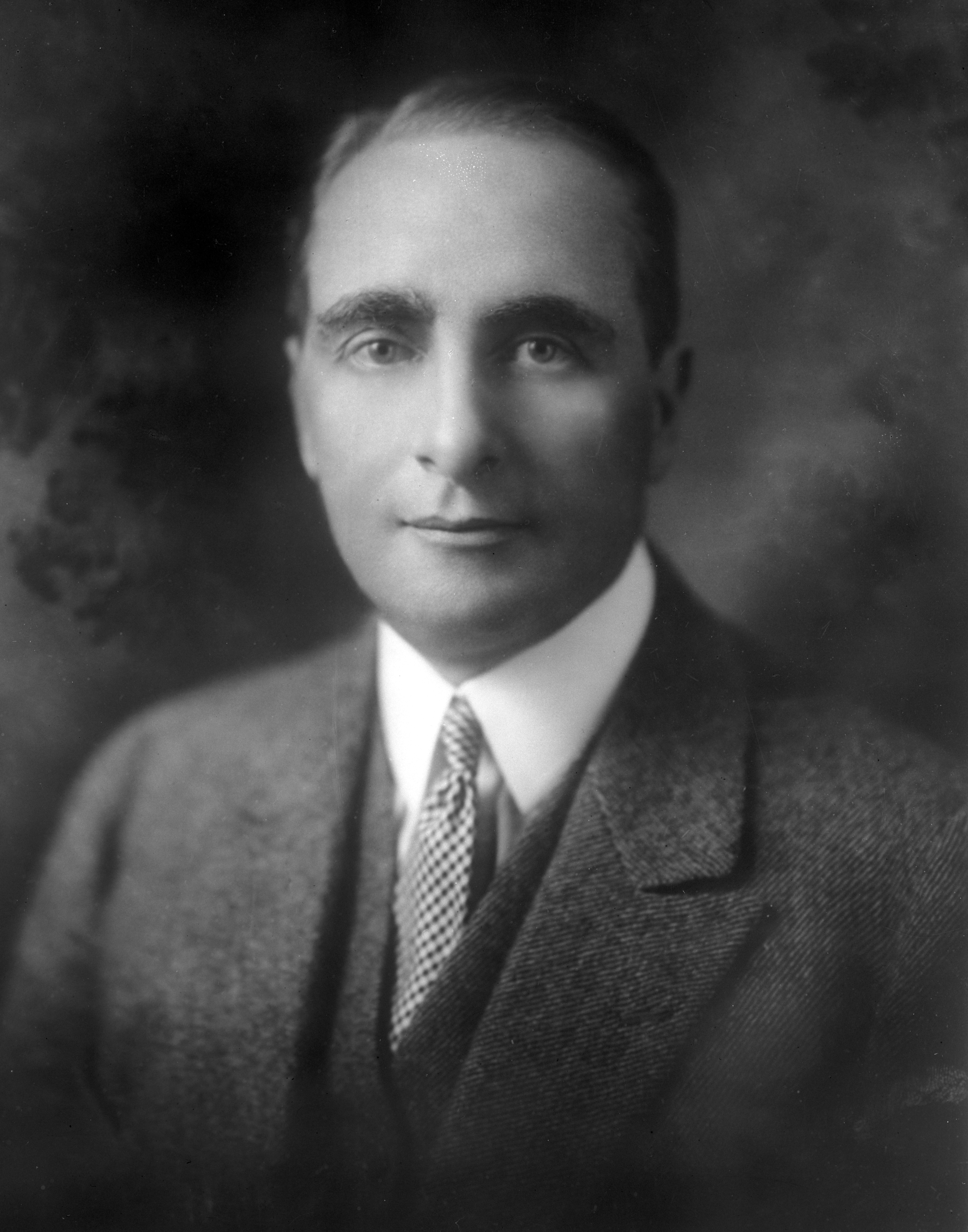
- Mills in 1905

50th United States Secretary of the Treasury
- In office February 12, 1932 – March 3, 1933
- President: Herbert Hoover
- Preceded by: Andrew Mellon
- Succeeded by: William H. Woodin

United States Under Secretary of the Treasury
- In office 1927–1932
- President: Calvin Coolidge; Herbert Hoover
- Preceded by: Garrard B. Winston
- Succeeded by: Arthur A. Ballantine

Member of the U.S. House of Representatives from New York's 17th district
- In office March 4, 1921 – March 3, 1927
- Preceded by: Herbert Pell
- Succeeded by: William W. Cohen

Member of the New York Senate from the 17th district
- In office January 1, 1915 – December 31, 1917
- Preceded by: Walter R. Herrick
- Succeeded by: Courtlandt Nicoll

Personal details
- Born: Ogden Livingston Mills; August 23, 1884 Newport, Rhode Island, U.S.
- Died: October 11, 1937 (aged 53) New York City, U.S.
- Party: Republican
- Spouses: Margaret Stuyvesant Rutherfurd (m. 1911; div. 1919) Dorothy Randolph Fell (m. 1924)
- Parent: Ogden Mills (father)
- Education: Harvard University (BA, LLB)

Military service
- Allegiance: United States
- Branch/service: United States Army
- Years of service: 1917–1918
- Rank: Captain
- Battles/wars: World War I

Ogden Livingston Mills (August 23, 1884 – October 11, 1937) was an American lawyer, businessman and politician. He served as United States Secretary of the Treasury in President Herbert Hoover's cabinet, during which time Mills pushed for tax increases, spending cuts and other austerity measures that would deepen the economic crisis. A member of the Republican Party, Mills also represented New York in the United States House of Representatives, served as Undersecretary of the Treasury during the administration of President Calvin Coolidge, and was the Republican nominee in the 1926 New York gubernatorial election.

== Early life ==
Mills was born on August 23, 1884, in Newport, Rhode Island, the son of Ogden Mills (1856–1929), a financier and racehorse owner, and his wife, the former Ruth T. Livingston (1855–1920), granddaughter of Maturin Livingston (1769–1847). He had twin sisters, Beatrice Mills Forbes (1883–1972) and Gladys Mills Phipps (1883–1970), and was the grandson of the banker Darius Ogden Mills.

Mills graduated from Harvard University in 1904, and graduated from Harvard Law School in 1907. He was admitted to the bar in 1908.

== Career ==
Mills and his sister Gladys owned Wheatley Stable, a horse racing and breeding operation. Their stable owned and bred Seabiscuit as well as Bold Ruler, whose offspring includes Secretariat.

Mills also owned Kantar who won the 1928 Prix de l'Arc de Triomphe.

After his father's death in 1929, Mills and each of his sisters received $12,197,034 from their father's estate.

=== Political career ===
Mills was a delegate to the 1912, 1916 and 1920 Republican National Conventions. He was a member of the New York State Senate from 1915 to 1917, sitting in the 138th, 139th and 140th New York State Legislatures, and was the Chairman of the Committee on Affairs of the New York City, New York in 1917.

He resigned his seat on July 31, 1917 to enlist in the United States Army, and served with the rank of captain until the close of World War I.

After the war, he served as president of the New York State Tax Association. He was elected to the United States House of Representatives from New York's 17th Congressional District as a Republican, serving in the 67th, 68th and 69th United States Congresses, holding office from March 4, 1921 until March 3, 1927.

In 1926, Mills ran on the Republican ticket for the Governor of New York, but was defeated by Al Smith, the incumbent Democrat.

=== Treasury ===
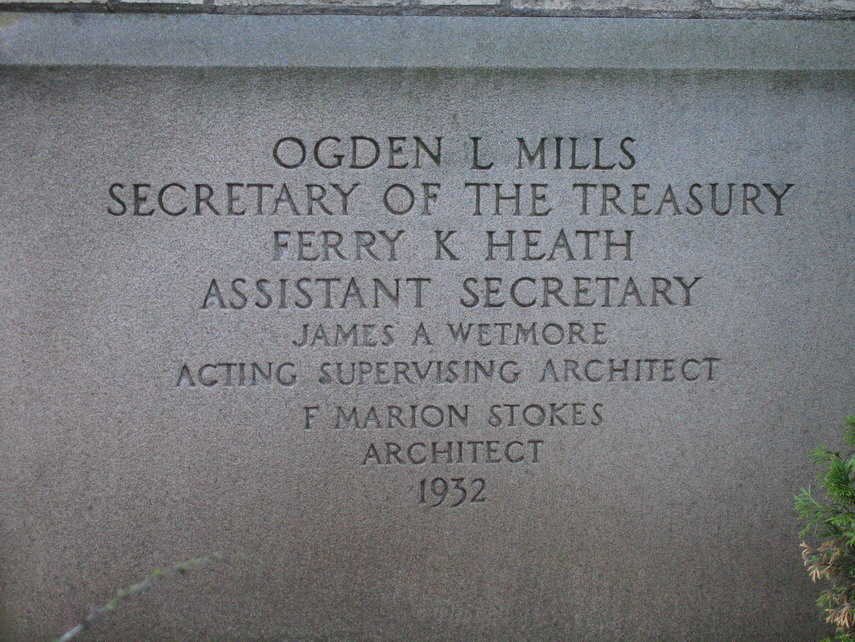
Corner stone of a post office dedicated during Mills' tenure as Treasury Secretary.

Mills was appointed in 1927, by President Calvin Coolidge as the Undersecretary of the Treasury, serving under Secretary Andrew W. Mellon.

In 1932, Mills was appointed by President Herbert Hoover as Secretary of the Treasury. While Secretary, Mills acted as an adviser to President Hoover and actively campaigned for Hoover's reelection in 1932, traveling to Detroit, St. Louis, Los Angeles, San Francisco, Chicago, and Minneapolis on his behalf. Hoover's opponent was then-Governor of New York Franklin D. Roosevelt, a Democrat who was Mills's college friend and life-long neighbor. Mills remained in office until March 3, 1933.

=== Later life ===
After leaving the Treasury Department, Mills was highly critical of Franklin D. Roosevelt's New Deal policies. He continued to be active in business, and published his views in two books, What of Tomorrow in 1935 and The Seventeen Million in 1937.

Mills served on the boards of the Lackawanna Steel Company, Atchison, Topeka and Santa Fe Railway, Virginia & Truckee Railroad, Mergenthaler Linotype Company and the Shredded Wheat Company.

While in New York, Mills was an active member of the New York Civitan Club.

== Personal life ==
On September 20, 1911, Mills married his first wife, Margaret Stuyvesant Rutherfurd (1891–1976), the daughter of Anne Harriman Rutherfurd and Lewis Morris Rutherfurd Jr. At the time of their wedding, she was the step-daughter of William Kissam Vanderbilt and the granddaughter of Lewis Morris Rutherfurd (1816–1892) and Oliver Harriman (1829–1904). They divorced in 1919. In 1922, she married Sir Paul Henry Dukes (1889–1967). They divorced in 1929 and, later that same year, she married Prince Charles Michel Joachim Napoléon (1892–1973), son of Joachim, 5th Prince Murat. They also divorced and in 1939, she married Frederick Leybourne Sprague.

On September 2, 1924, Mills married his second wife, Dorothy (née Randolph) Fell (d. 1968), the former wife of banker John R. Fell.

Mills died of heart disease in Manhattan, New York, on October 11, 1937. He had no children, but was the stepfather of three by his second wife. He was interred in St. James Churchyard, Hyde Park, New York.

== See also ==
- List of Harvard University people

New York State Senate
Preceded by Walter R. Herrick	Member of the New York Senate from the 17th district 1921–1927	Succeeded by Courtlandt Nicoll
U.S. House of Representatives
Preceded by Herbert Pell	Member of the U.S. House of Representatives from New York's 17th congressional district 1921–1927	Succeeded by William W. Cohen
Party political offices
Preceded by Theodore Roosevelt Jr.	Republican nominee for Governor of New York; 1926	Succeeded by Albert Ottinger
Political offices
Preceded by Andrew Mellon	United States Secretary of the Treasury; 1932–1933	Succeeded by William H. Woodin
