= Old Westbury, New York =

- Village
- Incorporated Village of Old Westbury
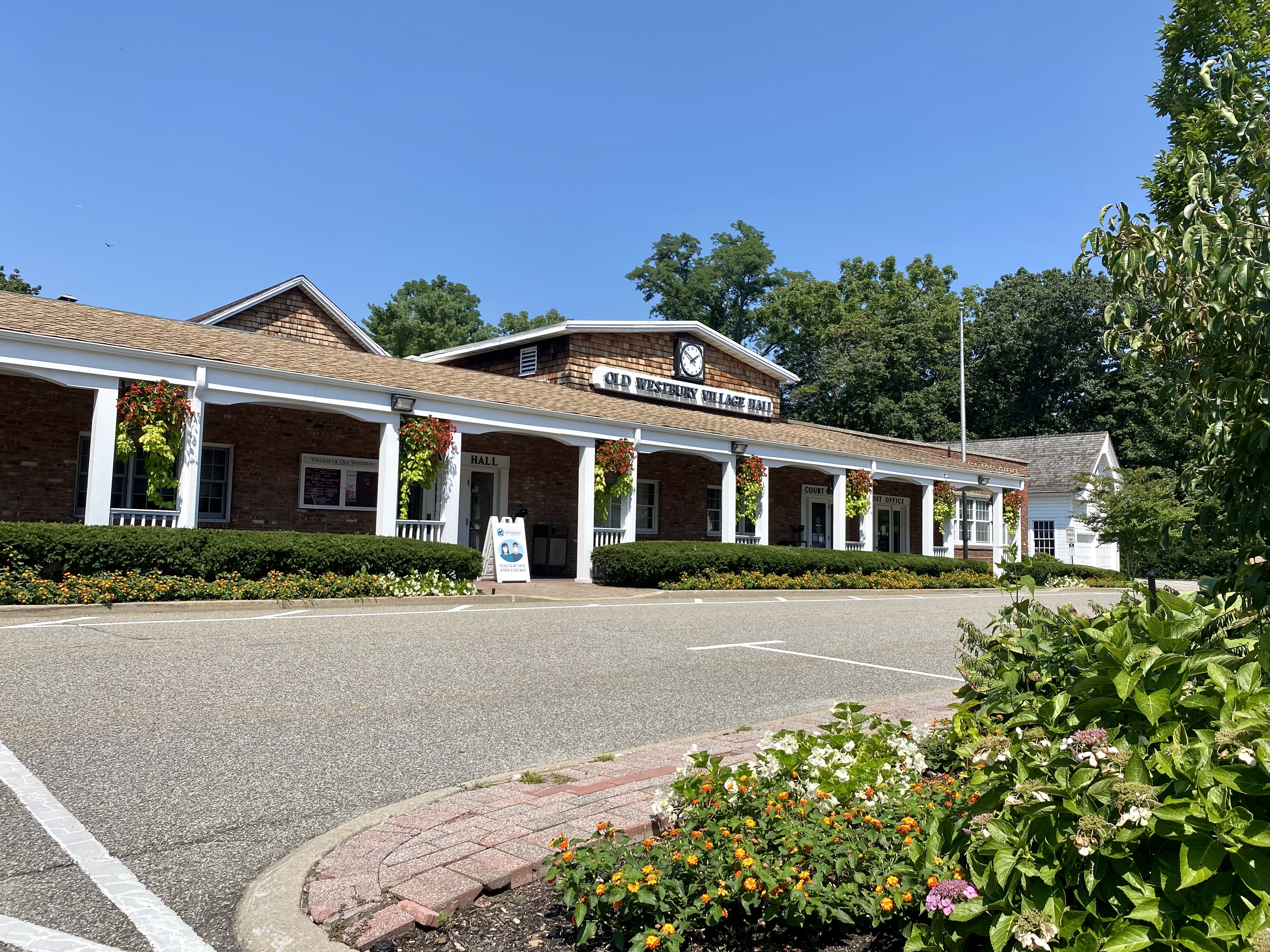
- Old Westbury Village Hall, Police Station, and Post Office in 2021
- Nickname: V.O.W.
- Location in Nassau County and the state of New York

- Location on Long Island Location within the state of New York
- Coordinates: 40°46′55″N 73°35′50″W
- Country: United States
- State: New York
- County: Nassau
- Towns: North Hempstead; Oyster Bay
- Incorporated: 1924
- Named for: Westbury, Wiltshire, England

Government
  - Mayor: Marina Chimerine
  - Trustees: List of Trustees: • Cory Baker; • Jeffrey K. Brown, Esq.; • Michelle Cervoni; • Andrew Weinberg

Area
  - Total: 8.57 sq mi (22.20 km^{2})
  - Land: 8.57 sq mi (22.20 km^{2})
  - Water: 0 sq mi (0.00 km^{2})
- Elevation: 160 ft (50 m)

Population (2020)
  - Total: 4,289
  - Density: 500.3/sq mi (193.18/km^{2})
- Time zone: UTC−5 (Eastern (EST))
  - Summer (DST): UTC−4 (EDT)
- ZIP Code: 11568
- Area codes: 516, 363
- FIPS code: 36-54705
- GNIS feature ID: 0959332
- Website: www.villageofoldwestbury.gov

Old Westbury is a village in the towns of North Hempstead and Oyster Bay in Nassau County, on the North Shore of Long Island, in New York, United States. The population was 4,289 at the time of the 2020 census.

The Incorporated Village of Old Westbury is one of the nation's wealthiest municipalities and is the second-richest zip code in the state of New York – topped only by Harrison in Westchester County. In 2007, Business Week dubbed Old Westbury as New York's most expensive suburb. Old Westbury Gardens – located within the village – has been recognized as one of the three best public gardens in the world by Four Seasons Hotels magazine.

== History ==
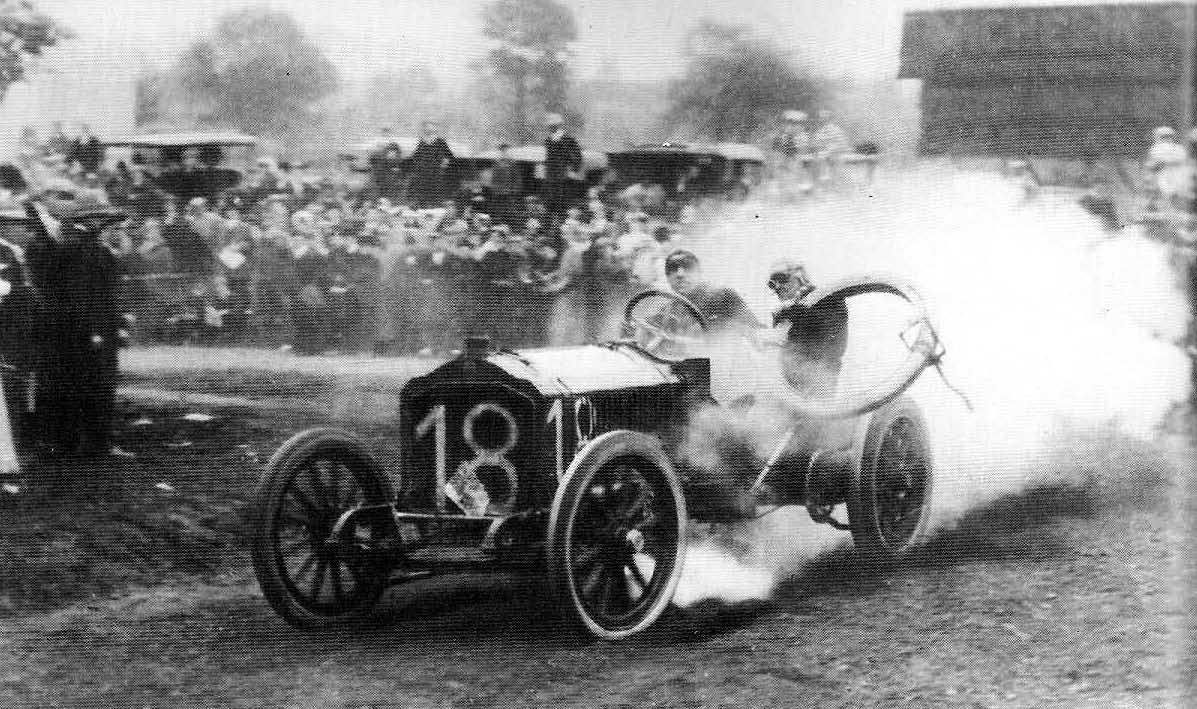
1906 Vanderbilt Cup hairpin turn in Old Westbury

=== Early history (pre-colonization–1924) ===
What is now the Village of Old Westbury was originally inhabited by Matinecock Native Americans. It was first settled by European colonists – primarily Dutchmen and Englishmen – in the mid-17th century.

The community of Westbury was founded by Edmond Titus, and was later joined by Henry Willis – one of the first English settlers in the area. Westbury had been a Quaker community of isolated farms until the railroad came in 1836.

After the Civil War, the New York elite discovered that the rich, well-wooded flat countryside of the Hempstead Plains was a place to raise horses, and to hunt foxes and play polo at the Meadow Brook Polo Club. Several large estates soon started springing up in the area about this time. Westbury House was the residence of Henry Phipps' eldest son, John Shaffer Phipps. Today, the property is operated as Old Westbury Gardens. Robert Low Bacon built 'Old Acres' in the style of an Italian villa. Other landowners were Thomas Hitchcock and his family, Harry Payne Whitney and his wife the former Gertrude Vanderbilt, founder of New York's Whitney Museum, at Apple Green (formerly a Mott house), Cornelius Vanderbilt Whitney, whose estate is now subdivided into the Old Westbury Country Club and New York Institute of Technology. The architect Thomas Hastings built a modest house for himself, 'Bagatelle', in 1908. A. Conger Goodyear, then president of the Museum of Modern Art in New York City had a house built in 1938 by famed architect Edward Durell Stone, who also destined the building for Conger's museum. In 2003, the A. Conger Goodyear House was added to the National Register of Historic Places to protect the structure from being demolished to subdivide the expensive land surrounding it. The estate of Robert Winthrop, an investment banker and member of the Dudley–Winthrop family, for whom Winthrop-University Hospital was named, has been similarly preserved. Part of Gertrude Vanderbilt Whitney's estate and her sculpture studio has been preserved and maintained by one of her grandchildren, Pamela Tower LeBoutillier.

=== Village of Old Westbury (1924–present) ===
Old Westbury was incorporated as a village in May 1924, separating itself from Westbury – the adjacent area that housed many of the families of the construction and building staffs for the Old Westbury mansions. Its first mayor was William W. Cocks. At the time of its incorporation, the village had a population of approximately 500. Residents wished to incorporate to better regulate local affairs, services, and development.

During World War II – a 187-foot-high tower at the present-day Old Westbury Golf & Country Club – aided the United States Military during World War II, and was used by the military as a lookout to spot enemy aircraft. Originally built as the water tower for the Cornelius Vanderbilt Whitney Residence, it now serves as the club's focal point.

On December 27, 1948, in a referendum vote of 81-to-6, a measure passed to allow 375 acres (152 ha) of territory at the westernmost edge of the village to secede, after four property owners in that area submitted a petition for the village to hold the vote and secede. This territory, accordingly, would become an unincorporated area of – and governed by – the Town of North Hempstead. A portion of the territory that seceded would become the Levitt & Sons-developed Roslyn Country Club development. Then, in April 1949, a smaller portion of west end of the village – the area bounded by Roslyn Road to the west, Glen Cove Road to the east, the present-day Long Island Expressway to the north, and the Northern State Parkway to the south – would be annexed by the Village of East Hills, leading to police services in the excluded territory automatically being switched from Old Westbury's village police department to the Nassau County Police Department that April.

When Robert Moses was planning the Northern State Parkway, the powers of Old Westbury forced him to re-site it five miles (8 km) to the south. Once the parkway was completed, many residents found it to not be the eyesore they had been anticipating and regretted making their commutes more inconvenient than necessary. In the 1950s, the state of New York purchased land from Charles E. Wilson – a former president of General Motors, who needed to sell off his Old Westbury estate to pull himself out of financial crisis and relocate to the nation's capital to serve in President Dwight D. Eisenhower's cabinet. Portions of the land was used for the Long Island Expressway, which was constructed through the community in the late 1950s and early 1960s.

When the Long Island Expressway was being planned, it was announced that the routing through the village would largely follow Old Westbury Road (then-New York State Route 25D) from Glen Cove Road at the East Hills–Old Westbury border east to where Old Westbury Road curves to the south (near present-day Old Westbury Village Hall), and then continue east to Jericho Turnpike (NY 25) (Exit 40) in unincorporated Jericho, just east of the village's border. The routing was approved by the community, under the conditions that no local exits would be constructed within the village between Exit 39 and Exit 40, and that the highway would also primarily be depressed through the village. The highway opened through the community east to Jericho at Exit 40 in the early 1960s.

=== Etymology ===
The "Old" part of Old Westbury's name reflects the United States Postal Service's need for the community to have its postal address be distinct from the Westbury in Cayuga County, pursuant to postal requirements; Old Westbury had been using a postal address of "North Hempstead" for this reason. Residents did this when they wanted a local post office in about 1841 – and, when they incorporated Old Westbury as a village, they felt that it would be confusing for the village name and post office name to be different from one another. The Village of Westbury – located to Old Westbury's immediate south – adopted that designation when it incorporated in 1932, as Cayuga County's Westbury's name was no longer being used.

The area was originally known as Wallage, which is related to a Native American term roughly meaning "ditch" or "hole." By February 1663, it was known as Wood Edge, and by October 1675 it was known as "the Plains edge" or simply Plainedge. The name Westbury began to be used for the area around 1683; this was chosen by Henry Willis, who named it after Westbury, Wiltshire, his hometown in England.

== Geography ==
According to the United States Census Bureau, the village has a total area of 8.57 square miles (22.2 km^{2}), all land.

The village lost territory to the Village of East Hills and the Town of North Hempstead in the late 1940s, between the 1940 census and the 1950 census.

=== Climate ===
According to the Köppen climate classification, Old Westbury has a Humid subtropical climate (type Cfa) with cool, wet winters and hot, humid summers. Precipitation is uniform throughout the year, with slight spring and fall peaks.

Climate data for Old Westbury, New York, 1991–2020 normals, extremes 1999–present
Month	Jan	Feb	Mar	Apr	May	Jun	Jul	Aug	Sep	Oct	Nov	Dec	Year
Record high °F (°C)	71 (22)	73 (23)	87 (31)	94 (34)	97 (36)	101 (38)	108 (42)	105 (41)	97 (36)	89 (32)	83 (28)	76 (24)	108 (42)
Mean daily maximum °F (°C)	40.4 (4.7)	42.9 (6.1)	51.1 (10.6)	61.2 (16.2)	70.6 (21.4)	79.6 (26.4)	84.5 (29.2)	83.3 (28.5)	76.0 (24.4)	65.4 (18.6)	55.7 (13.2)	45.1 (7.3)	63.0 (17.2)
Daily mean °F (°C)	33.4 (0.8)	35.0 (1.7)	42.0 (5.6)	51.8 (11.0)	60.8 (16.0)	70.1 (21.2)	75.2 (24.0)	74.1 (23.4)	67.2 (19.6)	56.5 (13.6)	47.8 (8.8)	38.2 (3.4)	54.3 (12.4)
Mean daily minimum °F (°C)	26.4 (−3.1)	27.1 (−2.7)	33.5 (0.8)	42.4 (5.8)	51.0 (10.6)	60.6 (15.9)	65.8 (18.8)	65.0 (18.3)	58.3 (14.6)	47.6 (8.7)	39.9 (4.4)	31.2 (−0.4)	45.7 (7.6)
Record low °F (°C)	−4 (−20)	−5 (−21)	5 (−15)	13 (−11)	34 (1)	43 (6)	50 (10)	46 (8)	36 (2)	27 (−3)	17 (−8)	−2 (−19)	−5 (−21)
Average precipitation inches (mm)	3.56 (90)	2.87 (73)	4.47 (114)	3.85 (98)	3.23 (82)	3.54 (90)	3.97 (101)	4.26 (108)	4.31 (109)	4.08 (104)	3.18 (81)	3.99 (101)	45.31 (1,151)
Average snowfall inches (cm)	5.5 (14)	7.8 (20)	3.7 (9.4)	0.3 (0.76)	0 (0)	0 (0)	0 (0)	0 (0)	0 (0)	0 (0)	0.2 (0.51)	5.7 (14)	23.2 (58.67)
Average relative humidity (%)	73	75	72	72	75	74	73	71	73	73	71	75	73
Mean monthly sunshine hours	177	153	172	167	202	213	237	241	215	190	210	171	2,348
Mean daily daylight hours	9.6	10.7	12.0	13.3	14.5	15.1	14.8	13.8	12.5	11.1	9.9	9.3	12.2
Average ultraviolet index	2	2	2	3	5	6	6	6	5	3	2	2	4
Source: NOAA; Weather Atlas

== Demographics ==
Historical population
Census	Pop.	Note	%±
1930	1,264		—
1940	1,017		−19.5%
1950	1,160		14.1%
1960	2,064		77.9%
1970	2,667		29.2%
1980	3,277		22.9%
1990	3,897		18.9%
2000	4,228		8.5%
2010	4,671		10.5%
2020	4,289		−8.2%
U.S. Decennial Census

=== 2020 census ===
As of the 2020 census, Old Westbury had a population of 4,289. The median age was 35.3 years. 15.9% of residents were under the age of 18 and 17.8% of residents were 65 years of age or older. For every 100 females there were 89.9 males, and for every 100 females age 18 and over there were 87.9 males age 18 and over.

70.2% of residents lived in urban areas, while 29.8% lived in rural areas.

There were 1,080 households in Old Westbury, of which 35.6% had children under the age of 18 living in them. Of all households, 72.6% were married-couple households, 10.9% were households with a male householder and no spouse or partner present, and 15.0% were households with a female householder and no spouse or partner present. About 11.1% of all households were made up of individuals and 6.6% had someone living alone who was 65 years of age or older.

There were 1,209 housing units, of which 10.7% were vacant. The homeowner vacancy rate was 1.9% and the rental vacancy rate was 13.9%.

Racial composition as of the 2020 census
Race	Number	Percent
White	2,310	53.9%
Black or African American	611	14.2%
American Indian and Alaska Native	13	0.3%
Asian	978	22.8%
Native Hawaiian and Other Pacific Islander	0	0.0%
Some other race	139	3.2%
Two or more races	238	5.5%
Hispanic or Latino (of any race)	318	7.4%

=== 2000 census ===
As of the census of 2000, there were 4,228 people, 1,063 households, and 967 families residing in the village. The population density was 493.9 inhabitants per square mile (190.7/km^{2}). There were 1,109 housing units at an average density of 129.5 per square mile (50.0/km^{2}). The racial makeup of the village was 73.19% White, 4.24% African American, 0.02% Native American, 7.52% Asian, 3.67% from other races, and 2.37% from two or more races. Hispanic or Latino of any race were 17.14% of the population.

There were 1,063 households, out of which 43.2% had children under the age of 18 living with them, 82.2% were married couples living together, 5.9% had a female householder with no husband present, and 9.0% were non-families. Of all households 5.6% were made up of individuals, and 2.9% had someone living alone who was 65 years of age or older. The average household size was 3.33 and the average family size was 3.37.

In the village, the age distribution of the population shows 22.7% under the age of 18, 20.2% from 18 to 24, 19.9% from 25 to 44, 25.7% from 45 to 64, and 11.6% who were 65 years of age or older. The median age was 35 years. For every 100 females, there were 86.7 males. For every 100 females age 18 and over, there were 84.6 males.

=== Income and poverty ===
The median income for a household in the village was $163,046, and the median income in the village was $184,298 for a family. The median earnings of the 899 households (89.6% of total households) in the village that took in earnings supplemental to income was $230,721. Males had a median income of $100,000+ versus $45,200 for females. The per capita income for the village was $72,932. About 1.1% of families and 3.5% of the population were below the poverty line, including 1.5% of those under age 18 and 3.3% of those age 65 or over.

== Government ==
The Village of Old Westbury is governed by the five-member Village of Old Westbury Board of Trustees, consisting of an elected mayor and four elected trustees.

As of March 2026, the Mayor of Old Westbury is Marina Chimerine.

=== Politics ===
In the 2024 U.S. presidential election, the majority of Old Westbury's voters voted for Donald J. Trump (R).

== Education ==
=== Public schools ===
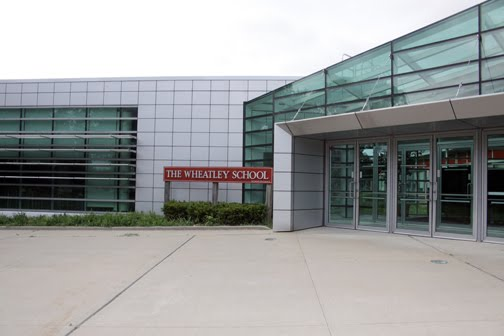
The Wheatley School in 2012

Residents are zoned to schools in one of four school districts, depending on where in the village they reside. They are the East Williston Union Free School District, the Jericho Union Free School District, the Roslyn Union Free School District, and the Westbury Union Free School District.

Additionally, the Westbury Union Free School District's high school, Westbury High School – along with the East Williston Union Free School District's secondary school, The Wheatley School – are located within the village.

=== Private schools ===
- Holy Child Academy – A private Catholic day school for children in kindergarten through grade eight.

=== Colleges and universities ===
- LIU Post – A private undergraduate and graduate university; southernmost portion is located within the village.
- New York Institute of Technology – A private undergraduate and graduate university; primarily located within the village.
- SUNY Old Westbury – A public, four-year liberal arts college.

== Landmarks ==
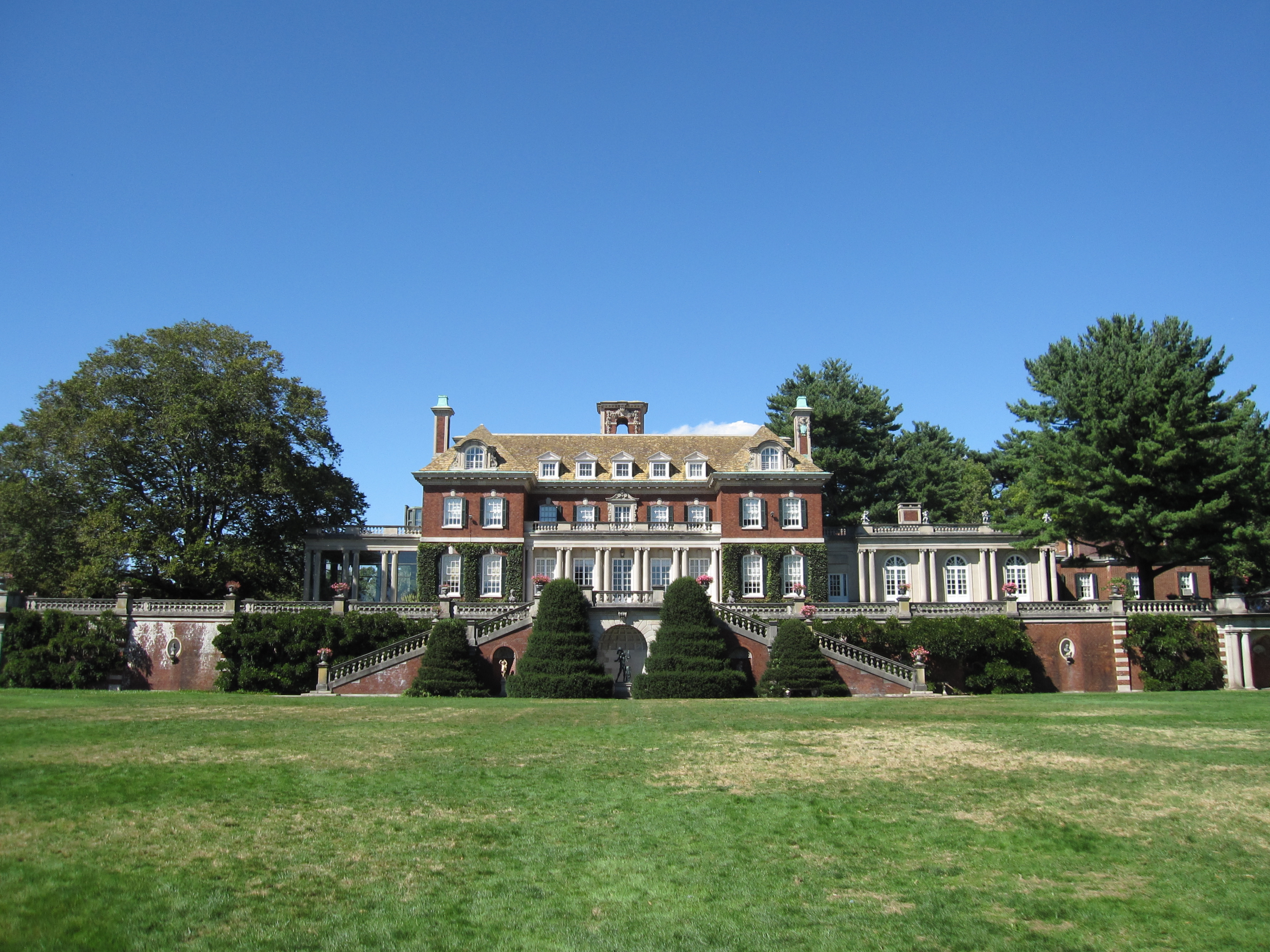
Old Westbury Gardens in 2010

- Meadow Brook Polo Club – The birthplace of American polo; oldest continuously operating polo club in the United States, first established in 1881.
- Old Westbury Gardens – A public English style garden, the former estate of lawyer and businessman John Shaffer Phipps; the property was converted into a museum home in 1959.

== Notable people ==
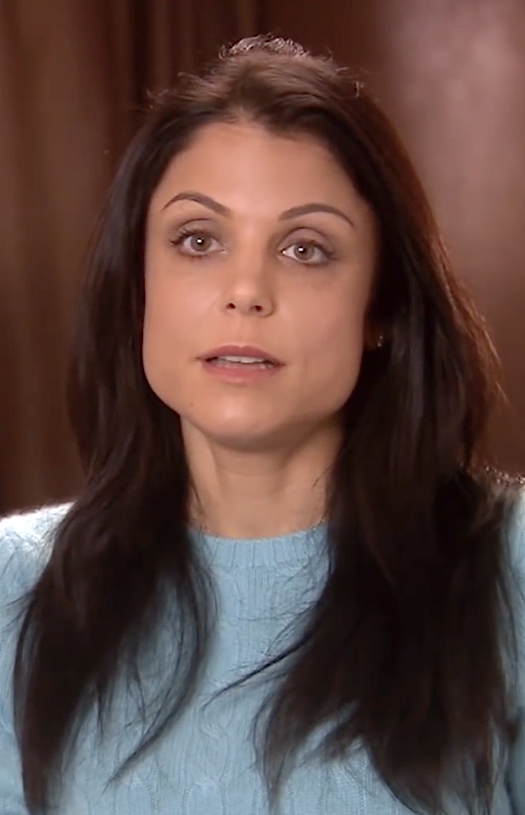
Bethenny Frankel

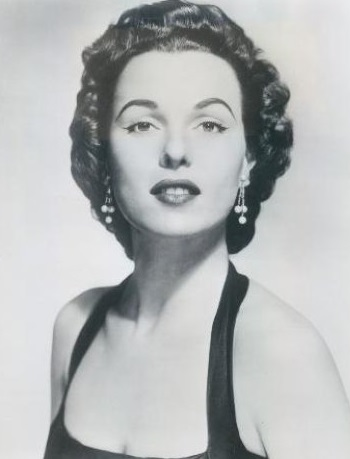
Bess Myerson

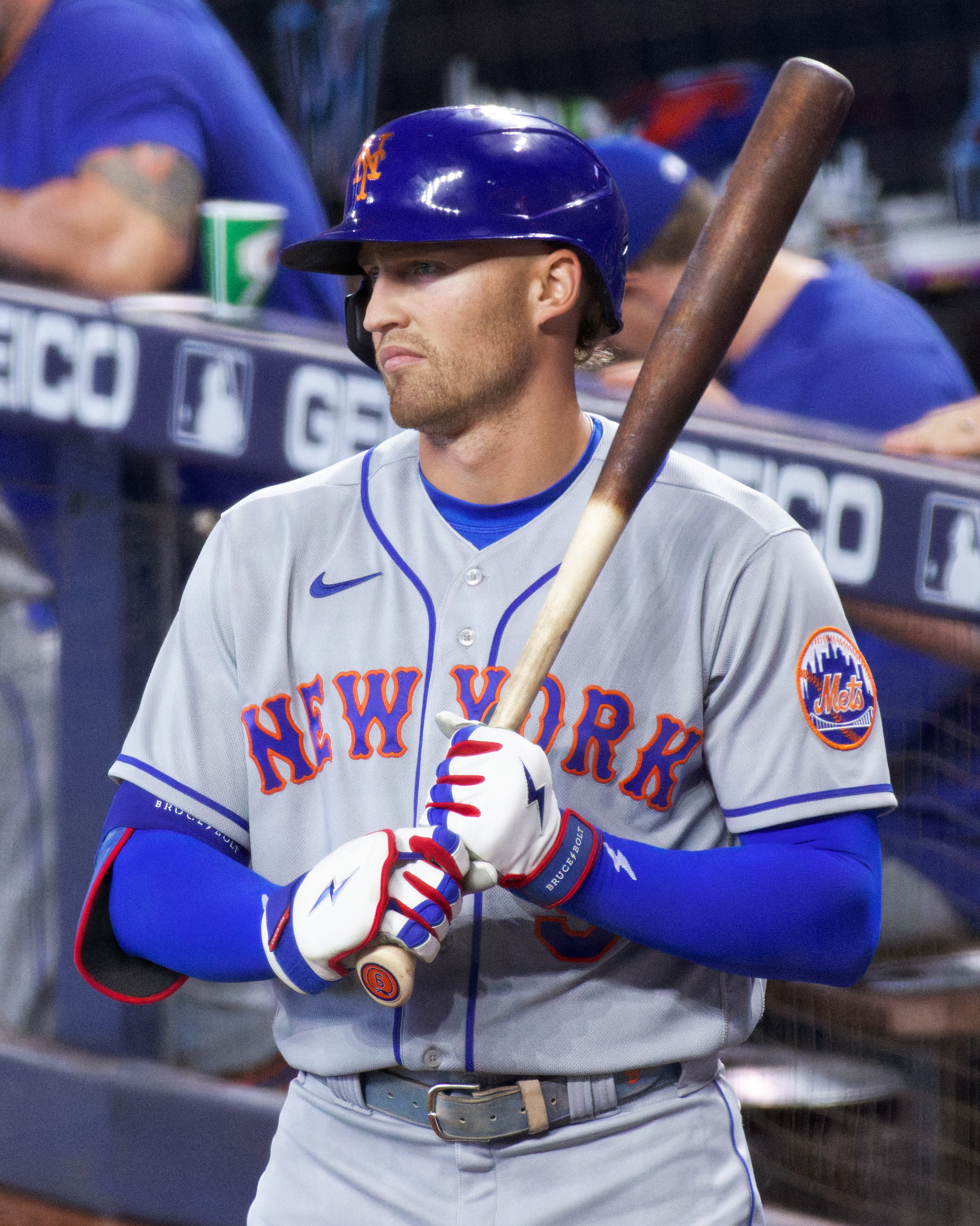
Brandon Nimmo

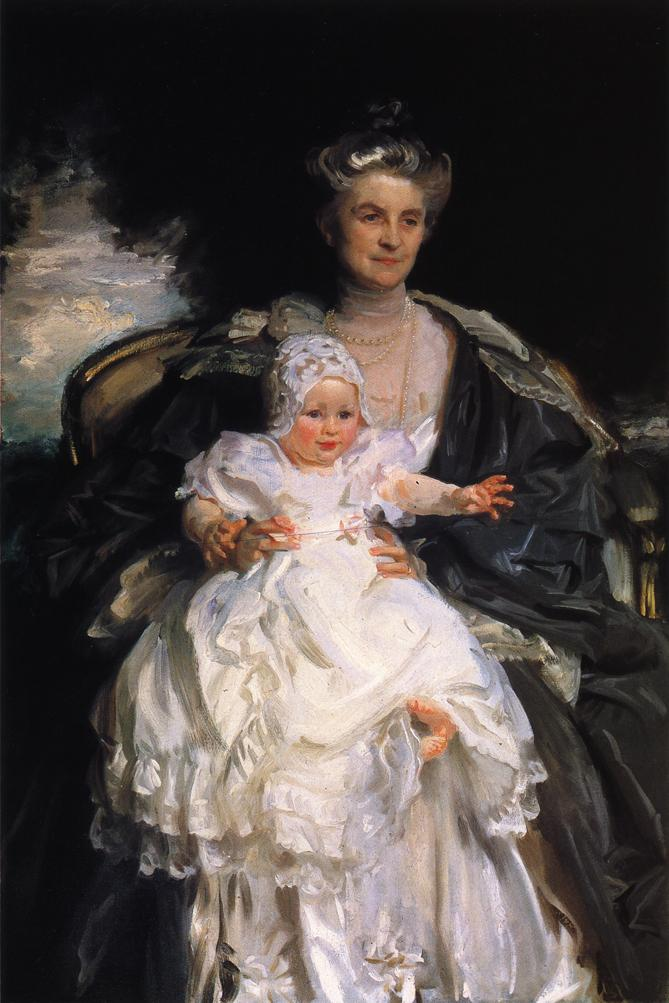
Mrs. Henry Phipps and Her Grandson Winston by John Singer Sargent (1906/07)

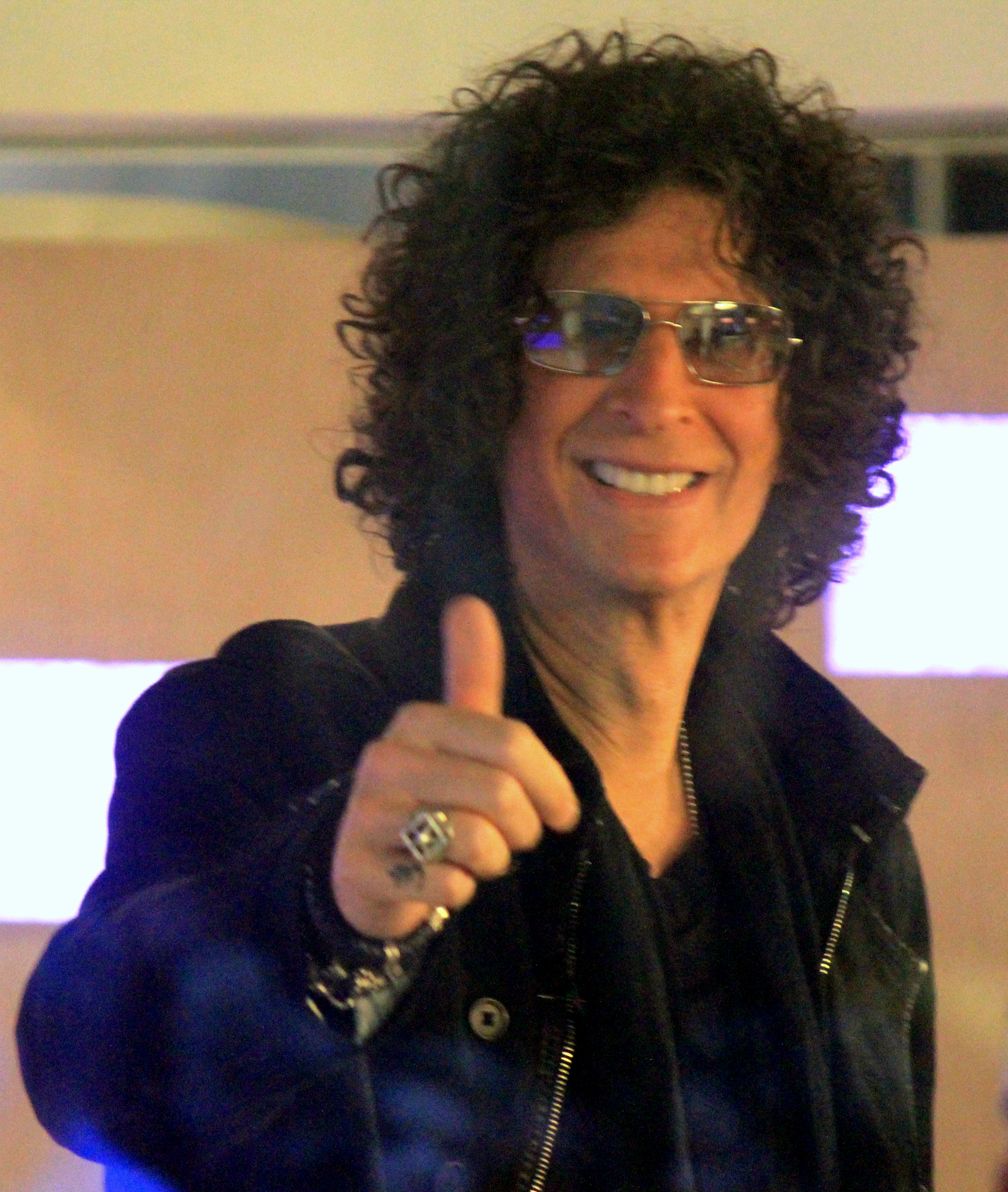
Howard Stern

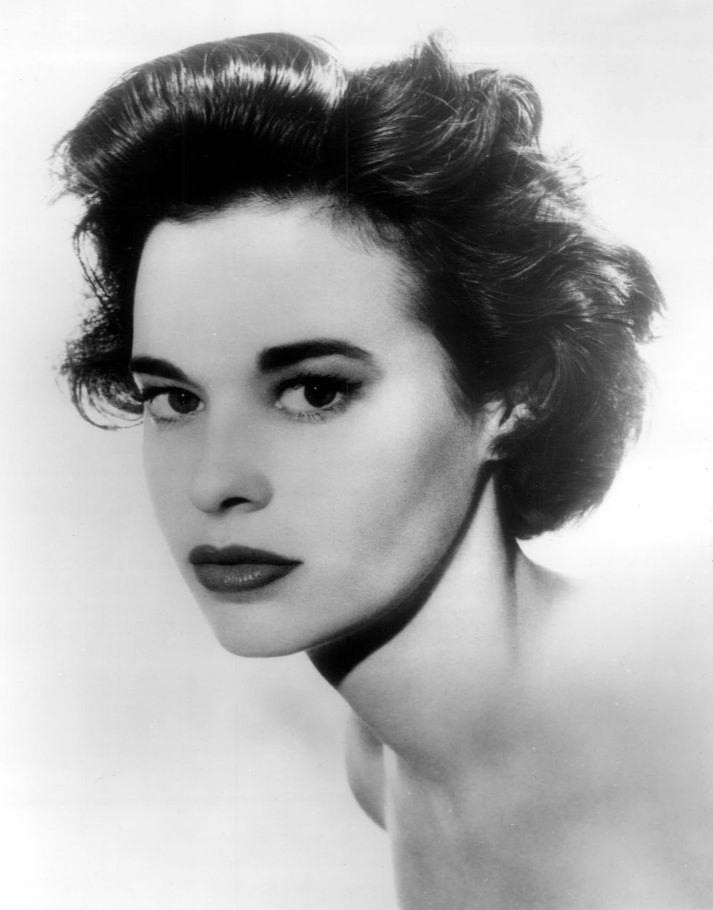
Gloria Vanderbilt

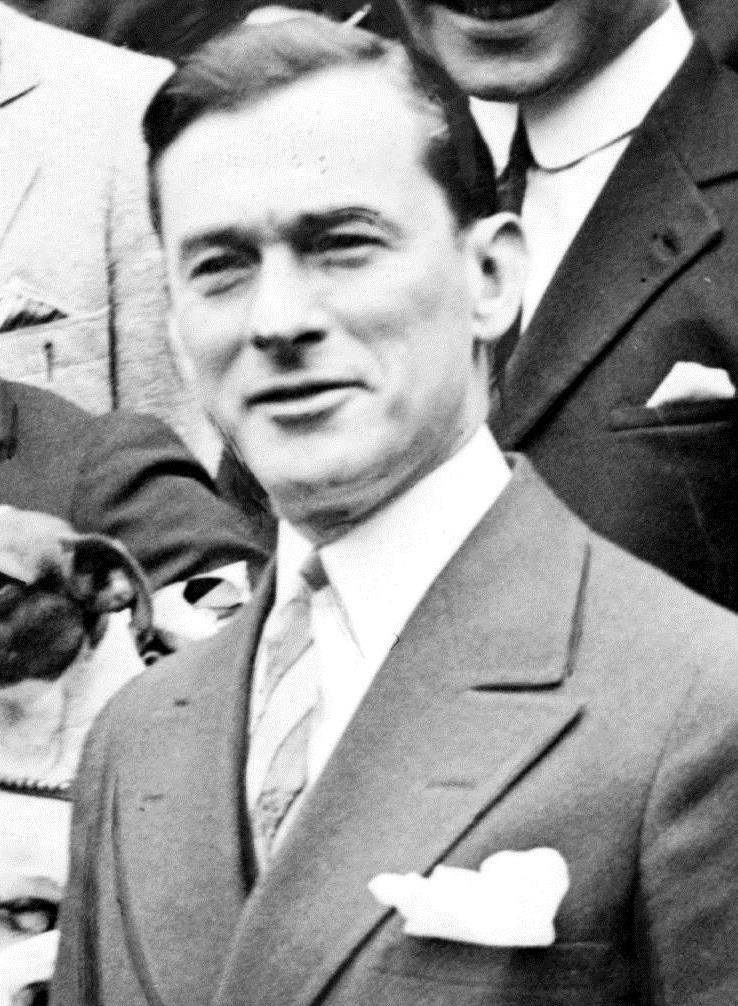
Jimmy Walker

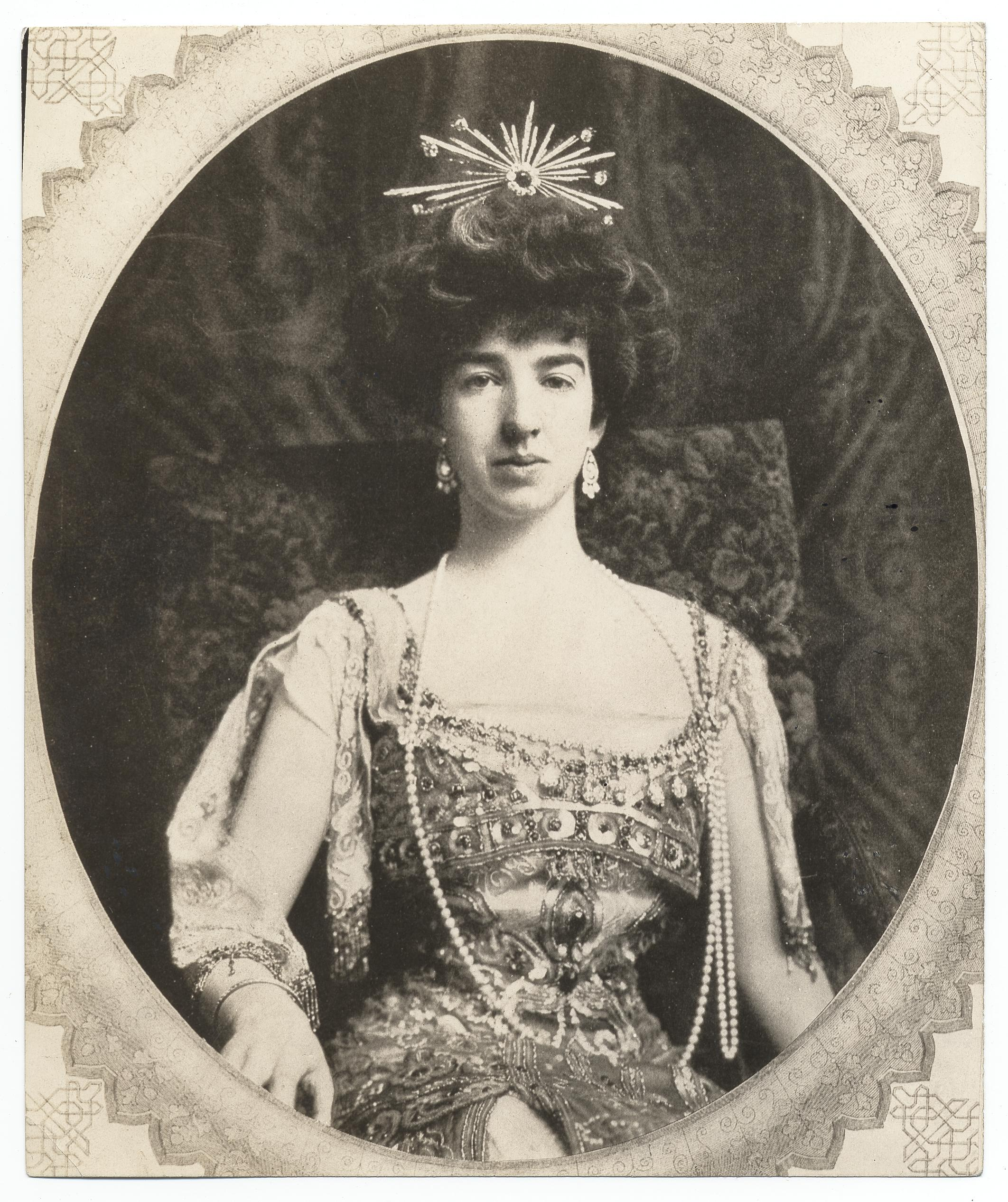
Gertrude Vanderbilt Whitney

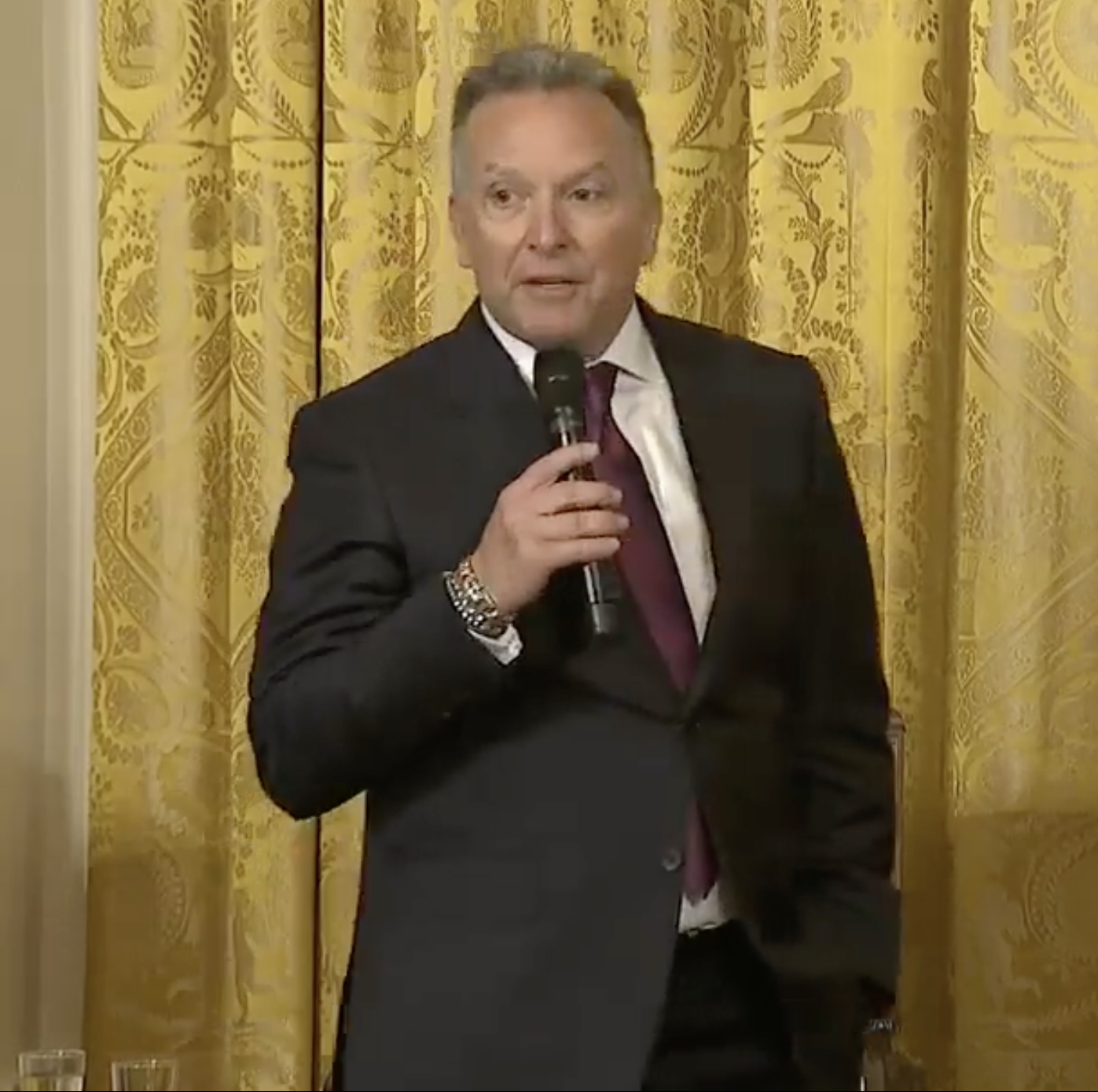
Steve Witkoff

- Jean Aberbach (1910–1992), Austrian-born American art collector, founder of Hill & Range music publishers that controlled much of the Elvis Presley catalog
- Carol Alt (born 1960), supermodel, television personality
- Frank Altimari (1928–1998), judge of the U.S. Court of Appeals for the Second Circuit
- Jerome Ash, owner of Sam Ash Music stores
- Doe Avedon (1925–2011), fashion model and actress, wife of Richard Avedon, the inspiration for Audrey Hepburn's character in Funny Face (Avedon was legally adopted by the wealthy employer of her biological father who served as a butler until his death)
- Robert Low Bacon (1884–1938), banker and congressman
- Florence Bellows Baker (1876–1936), philanthropist and horticulturist
- Charles T. Barney (1851–1907), president of Wells Fargo & Company, president of the Knickerbocker Trust Company
- Alva Belmont (1853–1933), socialite, woman's suffragist
- Oliver Belmont (1858–1908), son of August Belmont
- Harvey R. Blau (1935–2018), former mayor and deputy mayor; chairman and former CEO of Griffon Corporation
- Vira Boarman Whitehouse (1875–1957), woman suffragist, birth control proponent
- Albert C. Bostwick, Jr., steeplechase jockey, Thoroughbred racehorse owner/breeder/trainer, heir to the Standard Oil Trust
- Dunbar Bostwick, horseman, pilot, sportsman, heir to the Standard Oil Trust
- George Herbert Bostwick (1909–1982), tennis player, jockey, trainer
- Pete Bostwick, Standard Oil heir, tennis champion
- Carl Andrew Capasso, NYC contractor involved in bribery and tax evasion scandal
- Arielle Charnas (born 1987), fashion designer and blogger
- Michael Cimino (1939–2016), film writer and director
- F. Ambrose Clark, equestrian, heir to Singer Sewing Machine Co.
- Eliot Cross, architect and owner of Cross and Cross
- Marguerite Sawyer Hill Davis, socialite and one of the wealthiest women of her time
- Herman Duryea, thoroughbred race horse owner and breeder
- Herman Edwards (born 1954), Kansas City Chiefs coach
- Hervé Filion (1940–2017), Canadian harness racing driver
- Floyd H. Flake (born 1945), member of U.S. House of Representatives
- Max Fortunoff, founder/owner of Fortunoff department stores
- Bethenny Frankel (born 1970), SkinnyGirl cocktail founder, television personality (Real Housewives of New York City, Bethenny Ever After), author of multiple titles making The New York Times Best Seller list
- Robert L. Gerry, Jr., polo champion, real estate investor
- Erica Gimbel, socialite, reality television star on Princesses: Long Island
- Anson Goodyear, philanthropist, chairman of Gaylord Container Corporation, director of Paramount Pictures, director of the Gulf, Mobile and Ohio Railroad, first president of the Museum of Modern Art
- Victoria Gotti (born 1962), daughter of John Gotti, reality television star, author
- Michael P. Grace, Irish-American chairman of W. R. Grace and Company (NYC) and Grace Brothers & Co. Ltd. (London, England)
- C. Z. Guest, socialite, Truman Capote swan, celebrity gardener, author
- Cornelia Guest (born 1963), socialite, crowned "Deb of the Decade" by Andy Warhol (1980s), author
- Frederick Guest, British polo player, philanthropist, British politician and peer
- Winston Frederick Churchill Guest, Anglo-American polo champion, Phipps family heir
- Marie Norton Harriman (1903–1970), First Lady of New York, wife of W. Averell Harriman, art collector
- Thomas Hastings (1860–1929), architect, partner of Carrère and Hastings
- Leila Hadley (1925–2009), socialite, author
- Gustave Maurice Heckscher (1884–1967), pioneer seaplane aviator
- W. Barklie Henry (1867–1930), stockbroker, yachtsman
- Frederick Hicks (1872–1925), congressman, diplomat
- James N. Hill, Canadian-American Great Northern Railway heir, son of "the empire builder" James J. Hill and Margaret Sawyer Hill
- Abraham Hirschfeld, real estate developer and Broadway producer
- Thomas Hitchcock, polo champion
- Adam C. Hochfelder (born 1971), real estate magnate
- Rick Hoffman (born 1970), actor
- Edward Francis Hutton (1875–1962), financier and co-founder of E. F. Hutton & Co.
- Matthew Ianniello (1920–2012), restaurateur, alleged Genovese crime family acting boss.
- Kevin James (born 1965), actor
- Reza Jarrahy (born 1956), plastic surgeon, former husband of actress Geena Davis
- Peter S. Kalikow (born 1942), real estate magnate, car collector, former Forbes 400 member, New York Post owner, Metropolitan Transportation Authority chairman, and Port Authority of New York and New Jersey commissioner
- Foxhall Keene (1867–1941), champion automobile racer, polo player, thoroughbred breeder, purported original namesake for "Chicken à la King"
- Charles Kelman (1930–2004), eye surgeon, medical pioneer
- Ed Kranepool (1944–2024), New York Mets first baseman
- Nicole Krauss (born 1974), author, wife of Jonathan Safran Foer
- James Lanier (1800–1881), entrepreneur, banker, founder of Winslow, Lanier & Co., owner of Lanier Mansion
- John LeBoutillier (born 1953), U.S. congressman
- Jack Liebowitz (1900–2000), original co-owner of DC Comics
- William Goadby Loew (1875–1955), financier and stockbroker
- James Brown Lord (1859–1902), architect
- Charles B. Macdonald, builder of first U.S. 18-hole golf course and other courses, founder of United States Golf Association
- Jack Martins (born 1967), NYS Senator, former mayor of Mineola
- Shep Messing (born 1949), soccer goalkeeper, broadcaster, and chairman of the Major Arena Soccer League
- Marvin Middlemark (1919–1989), inventor of/patent-holder for the "rabbit ears" television antenna
- Devereux Milburn, champion polo player, attorney at Carter Ledyard & Milburn, son of John G. Milburn
- E.D. Morgan III, Morgan family heir, Pioneer Fund director, grandson/namesake of the NY governor and U.S. Senator
- Bess Myerson (1924–2014), Miss America (1945)
- Nas (born 1973), rapper
- Brandon Nimmo (born 1993), MLB outfielder for the New York Mets
- John Parisella (born 1940), horse trainer
- Darragh Park (1939–2009), artist, executor of the James Schuyler estate
- Angel Penna, Sr. (1923–1992), Argentine-born thoroughbred horse trainer
- Murray Pergament, founder of Pergament Home Centers
- Henry Phipps, Jr., Carnegie Steel Company partner, philanthropist
- Henry Carnegie Phipps, Carnegie Steel Company heir, Phipps family heir, sportsman, Wheatley Stable owner
- Hubert Beaumont Phipps, Phipps family and Grace family heir, publisher, thoroughbred breeder
- John Shaffer Phipps, director of U.S. Steel and W. R. Grace & Co.
- Lillian Bostwick Phipps, socialite, thoroughbred horse stable owner
- Michael Grace Phipps, polo champion, Phipps family and Grace family heir, board member of Bessemer Trust and W.R. Grace & Co.
- Ogden Phipps, Carnegie Steel heir, tennis champion, philanthropist
- Leonard Pines (1911–2001), owner of Hebrew National
- Fred Plum (1924–2010), neurosurgeon, developed the term "persistent vegetative state" and treated President Nixon
- Lilly Pulitzer (1931–2013), designer, socialite
- Aby Rosen (born 1960), German and American art collector and real estate mogul with holdings including the Seagram Building, Lever House, W South Beach, Gramercy Park Hotel, Paramount Hotel, and Planet Hollywood Miracle Mile Shops
- Steven Rubenstein (1962–2012), anthropologist
- Ely Sakhai, notorious gallery owner and art forger
- David B. Samadi, former chairman of Urology and Chief of Robotic Surgery at Lenox Hill Hospital
- Harvey Sanders, Nautica CEO, chairman of the board and president, Under Armour director
- Vito Schnabel (born 1986), art dealer, actor, writer and producer, son of Julian Schnabel
- Steven Schonfeld, billionaire, ranked 371 on Forbes 400
- Eleanor Searle (1908–2002), philanthropist, singer
- John Shalam, founder and CEO of Audiovox
- Igor Sikorsky (1889–1972), Russian-American airplane developer and first major producer of helicopters
- David Simon (born 1960), CEO of Simon Property Group
- Bernice Steinbaum (born 1941), gallerist, dealer, curator, juror, speaker, author
- Howard Stern (born 1954), entertainer
- Beatrice Straight, member of Whitney family, Academy Award-winning actress
- Willard Dickerman Straight, banker, diplomat, co-founder of The New Republic magazine
- Harold E. Talbott, early aviator, president of Dayton-Wright Airplane Company, third United States Secretary of the Air Force.
- Seabury Tredwell, future owner of what is now the Merchant's House Museum in Manhattan
- Barry Van Gerbig (born 1939), socialite, son-in-law of Douglas Fairbanks, Jr., NHL owner
- Consuelo Vanderbilt (1877–1964), Vanderbilt family heiress, wife of, firstly, Charles Spencer-Churchill, 9th Duke of Marlborough and, secondly, record-breaking pilot Jacques Balsan
- Gloria Vanderbilt (1924–2019), Vanderbilt family heiress, clothing and perfume designer
- Harold Stirling Vanderbilt, Vanderbilt family heir, prominent railroad industrialist, philanthropist and yachtsman
- William Kissam Vanderbilt II, Vanderbilt family heir, prominent motor racer and yachtsman
- Francis Skiddy von Stade, Sr. (1884–1967), polo champion, Saratoga Race Course president
- Ira Waldbaum, built up the Waldbaum's supermarket chain from a six store operation into one of the largest in the Northeast
- George Herbert Walker (1875–1953), banker and businessman, namesake and grandfather of U.S. president George H. W. Bush, namesake and great-grandfather of U.S. President George W. Bush
- Jimmy Walker (1881–1946), flamboyant New York City Mayor, part of the powerful Tammany Hall machine
- Electra Havemeyer Webb (1888–1960), collector, philanthropist, founder of the Shelburne Museum
- James Watson Webb (1802–1884), owner of New York Courier and Enquirer newspaper, politician
- J. Watson Webb, Jr. (1916–2000), film editor, heir to both the Havemeyer and Vanderbilt families
- William Collins Whitney (1841–1904), founder of the Whitney family, financier, U.S. Cabinet member, thoroughbred stable owner
- Cornelius Vanderbilt Whitney, Vanderbilt family and Whitney family heir, financier, philanthropist
- Dorothy Payne Whitney, Whitney family heiress, co-founder of The New Republic magazine and the Dartington School
- Gertrude Vanderbilt Whitney, Vanderbilt family heiress, founder of the Whitney Museum of American Art
- Harry Payne Whitney, member of Whitney family, thoroughbred horse breeder
- Marylou Whitney, socialite, philanthropist, thoroughbred stable owner
- John Wilmerding (1938–2024), art collector, curator and professor, Havemeyer and Vanderbilt family heir
- Charles E. Wilson (1890–1961), president of General Motors, U.S. Cabinet member
- Steve Witkoff (born 1957), Special Envoy to the Middle East for U.S. President Donald Trump; real estate investor and developer, founder of the Witkoff Group, attorney
- Louis Wolfson (1912–2007), financier, thoroughbred horse owner
- Raphael Yakoby, creator of Hpnotiq
- Alexei Yashin (born 1973), Russian professional hockey player, New York Islanders

== In popular culture ==
=== Film ===
- Admission (2013), starring Tina Fey and Paul Rudd filmed at HorseAbility at SUNY Old Westbury
- The Age of Innocence (1993), starring Daniel Day-Lewis: the scenes depicting May Welland (Winona Ryder)'s Floridian mansion were actually shot in Old Westbury
- American Gangster (2007), starring Denzel Washington: Dominic Cattano's house
- Arthur (1981): the mansion that Arthur (Dudley Moore) lives in
- The Associate (1996): Whoopi Goldberg's character Ayers attends an Old Westbury house party dressed as Cutty (a man) for the first time
- Bernard and Doris (2008): the Phipps' estate used for the Doris Duke (played by Susan Sarandon) mansion in Newport, Rhode Island
- Blue Jasmine (2013): Old Westbury estate used in this Woody Allen film
- The Bourne Legacy (2012), starring Jeremy Renner, Rachel Weisz, Edward Norton: residences on the village's famous tree-lined street were shot for the film
- Cruel Intentions (1999): the home of Kathryn (Sarah Michelle Gellar) and Sebastian's (Ryan Phillippe's) Aunt Helen on Long Island, where Annette (Reese Witherspoon) is living
- The Curse of the Jade Scorpion (2001) by Woody Allen: scenes shot at Old Westbury gardens and mansion
- Dark Horse (2012), starring Jordan Gelber, Selma Blair, Christopher Walken and Mia Farrow: Old Westbury homes were shot to serve as Abe's (Gelber's) home and the "fantasy" home
- From the Terrace (1960), starring Paul Newman and Joanne Woodward
- Hitch (2005), starring Will Smith and Eva Mendes: Allegra Cole’s house
- Just Tell Me What You Want (1980) by Sidney Lumet, home of character played by Alan King
- Leave the World Behind (2023), starring Julia Roberts, Mahershala Ali, Ethan Hawke and Kevin Bacon: the Long Island rental is The Open Corner farmhouse estate in Old Westbury
- Love Story (1970), starring Ali MacGraw and Ryan O'Neal: the home of Oliver's wealthy father
- Lovesick (1983), starring Dudley Moore, Elizabeth McGovern, and Alec Guinness
- The Manchurian Candidate (2004): the Phipps' estate used for the home of Eleanor Shaw (played by Meryl Streep)
- The Muppets (2011), Phipps mansion filmed as home of Tex Richman, an oil tycoon played by Chris Cooper
- No Hard Feelings (2023), starring Jennifer Lawrence and Matthew Broderick: "giant house party" scene filmed in Old Westbury home
- North by Northwest (1959) by Alfred Hitchcock: Townsend's home, where Roger Thornhill (Cary Grant) is taken after being kidnapped
- Reversal of Fortune (1990), starring Glenn Close and Jeremy Irons: the Knole estate used for interiors of the Sunny von Bülow mansion
- The Swimmer (1968), starring Burt Lancaster
- To Wong Foo, Thanks for Everything! Julie Newmar (1995), starring Wesley Snipes and Patrick Swayze: film's final scene
- Wolf (1994): the country home of Laura (Michelle Pfeiffer) where Jack Nicholson's character first becomes a wolf, which appears on the DVD cover

=== Television ===
- Alpha House: The second season of the Amazon series starring John Goodman had scenes filmed in an Old Westbury estate
- Fallout: Walton Goggins' characters midcentury home is filmed in Norman Jaffe-designed Old Westbury estate
- Gossip Girl: Season two's nineteenth episode, "The Grandfather", originally airing March 23, 2009, featured an Old Westbury estate as the "van der Bilt" mansion
- The Gilded Age: Season two's sixth episode, "Warning Shots", originally airing November 26, 2023
- Paper Dolls: 1984 primetime drama starring Morgan Fairchild, Nicollette Sheridan, Lauren Hutton and Mimi Rogers
- Person of Interest: Season one's seventeenth episode, "Baby Blue", originally airing March 8, 2012, included Moretti's car crash and other road scenes filmed in Old Westbury. The series returned to Old Westbury for the fifth season's sixth episode, "A More Perfect Union", originally airing May 23, 2016, which included horse-riding scenes at the Dudley–Winthrop family estate and a wedding at the Alexander de Seversky mansion.
- Royal Pains: Season one's third episode, "Strategic Planning", originally airing June 18, 2009, features the Phipps estate as the home of a wealthy senator and used the lawn as a University of Notre Dame Fighting Irish practice field
- Sex and the City: Season five's finale episode, "I Love a Charade", originally airing September 8, 2002, featured an Old Westbury home in place of an estate in the Hamptons.
- You: Season five's fourth episode, "My Fair Maddie", originally streaming April 24, 2025, featured Reagan Lockwood's and Harrison Jacobs' Old Westbury home, with a fight taking place in the indoor swimming pool and bowling alley of the mansion's amenities floor.
- Your Friends and Neighbors: Season two features an Old Westbury estate as Nick Brandes' new amenity-rich mansion

=== Reality television ===
- America's Castles: A&E Network documentary series on gilded age homes featured Peggy Phipps Boegner touring one of the Phipps family's estates on the episode airing August 8, 1995, entitled "The Gold Coast".
- Growing Up Gotti: A&E Network reality series about life in Victoria Gotti's Old Westbury home in 2004 and 2005
- Princesses: Long Island: Bravo reality series, which features Old Westbury resident Erica Gimbel as one of the six original cast members
- Secrets and Wives: Bravo reality series, that features the lives of women living in Old Westbury and surrounding towns
- Selling New York: In season five's first episode, "A Prince Looks for a Property...", originally airing January 19, 2012, Prince Lorenzo Borghese views an Old Westbury estate, along with two other North Shore properties, but ultimately does not purchase any of the properties because he found that they each were too large

== Wealth ==
According to Bloomberg/Businessweek, as of 2011, Old Westbury was the second "richest" town in the United States, trailing behind only Palm Beach, Florida. The magazine previously dubbed the town "New York's wealthiest suburb."

Based on a study done by Bloomberg in 2015, the average household income in the village was greater than $640,000.

In 2011, Forbes, having done a study of "America's Millionaire Capitals", found that the average net worth of Old Westbury households was $19.6 million and with an average annual income of $1.2 million. The controlled study included only households with incomes greater than $200,000, which excluded only residents that are living in college dormitories and the staff of homeowners.

The village is famous for being the seat of many of New York's (and America's) wealthiest families, including the Phippses, Vanderbilts, Whitneys, Webbs, Du Ponts, Winthrops, Mortimers, Belmonts and Huttons. While many of these older families—the founding members of the social elite and those that emerged during the gilded age—still count members as Old Westbury residents, the village has also maintained a substantial set of industrialists, businessmen, collectors, athletes and entertainers.

The Old Westbury Fund is a hedge fund that is named after the town.

When Forbes asked billionaire investor Steven Schonfeld what the "wisest investment" he ever made was, his answer was "Old Westbury land".

== See also ==
- List of municipalities in New York
- Old Brookville, New York
