= Pergament =

Pergament may refer to:

- Parchment, alternative name
- Pergament Home Centers, a defunct home improvement store chain that primarily operated in New York

== Persons with the surname ==
- Moses Pergament, Finnish-Swedish composer and conductor
- Russel Pergament, American journalist and publisher
- Sarah Nyberg Pergament, Swedish electronica musician
