= Adam C. Hochfelder =

American real estate executive (born 1971)

Adam Hochfelder
- Born: Adam C. Hochfelder; 1971 (age 54–55); Old Westbury, New York
- Education: B.A. University of Pennsylvania
- Occupations: Managing Director, Real Estate
- Years active: 1996–present
- Known for: co-founder of Max Capital
- Spouses: Amy Meadow (divorced); Lisa Damiani
- Children: 2

Adam C. Hochfelder (born 1971) is an American real estate executive who co-founded the real estate firm Max Capital in 1996, with members of the powerful Kalikow real estate family. At its peak, Max Capital had ownership or management stakes in 8,000,000 square feet (740,000 m^{2}) of space, including the Helmsley Building and the Conde Nast Building. His portfolio was valued at as much as $2.7 billion at its peak. Some of the nation's largest institutions invested side by side with Hochfelder including JP Morgan, Citigroup, Wells Fargo, Goldman Sachs, Credit Suisse and Fidelity. He bought out N. Richard Kalikow from his partnership because of a soured relationship in 2002. Hochfelder paid Kalikow $35 million, of which $18 million was Hochfelder's own money, and he borrowed $17 million from banks to help finance the buyout of Kalikow. Some of the loans were collateralized in a manner inconsistent with reporting regulations. Hochfelder voluntarily paid back all of the money to complete the transaction. Due to NYS regulations, he was obligated to serve 14 months in a NYS program. Hochfelder is known as the "Wharton Whiz Kid" for his ability to financially structure and acquire some of NYC's largest properties which helped him generate multimillion-dollar deals. Currently, Hochfelder is the Managing Director of Real Estate Acquisitions & Development at Merchants Hospitality.

== Early life and education ==
Born to a Jewish family and Hochfelder was raised on Long Island, in Old Westbury, NY. In 1993, he graduated from University of Pennsylvania's Wharton School of Business.

== Career ==
After school, he worked as a broker and eventually formed a partnership with Richard Kalikow, cousin of Peter Kalikow. He served as co-CEO of the firm, named Max Capital.

== Deals ==
- In 1998, Max Capital acquired 230 Park Avenue for $300 million. This 1929 tower was a former Helmsley property, and Hochfelder worked with the Bass family to pay for it. Later in 2005, a Dubai prince bought it for $705 million.
- In 1999, Hochfelder purchased the 1440 Broadway near Times Square for $152 million.
- In 2000, he was involved in the development of the multiple luxury hotel properties including the Hyatt Andaz at 485 Fifth Avenue in NYC.
- In 2002, Hochfelder acquired multiple residential properties in New York and Chicago worth $740 million. His other acquisitions include the former Condé Nast building at 350 Madison Avenue ($180 Million).
- In 2003, Hochfelder purchased a massive building adjacent to Grand Central Terminal, the 237 Park Avenue for $455 million. He purchased this building known for its soaring, glass-roofed interior for a relatively low price, $379 a square foot - compared to $600 a square foot Boston Properties paid in 2002 for 399 Park Ave. The same year he made a deal with Texas investors to pay $320 million for full control over 450 West 33rd Street, home to the Daily News and the Associated Press.
- In 2005, he successfully acquired the Tommy Hilfiger Building for $88 million. This was a 185,000-square-foot office building at the northeast corner of 41st Street, overlooking the New York Public Library's main branch at 485 Fifth Avenue.
- In 2006, Hochfelder acquired the Westin Aruba Resort and Casinoin the Caribbean from Oswaldo Cisneros, CEO of Pepsico South America.
- In 2013, Hochfelder partnered with Eric Hadar and together they acquired the 1619 Broadway Brill Building, a $185 Million Retail and Office Building in Times Square. Later that year, they sold it for $250 million.

Hochfelder was also responsible for the acquisition of 2412 Broadway, a luxury residential apartment building on the Upper West Side and for Merchants Hospitality’s acquisition of the Global Hospitality & Restaurant Brand, Philippe Chow located in NYC.

== Convictions ==
In 2010, he was sentenced to serve at least two years and eight months, with a maximum of eight years in prison for fraud. On March 1, 2019, Hochfelder entered into a guilty plea to a misdemeanor after being charged with scheme to defraud in the 1st degree.

== Personal life ==
His first wife was Amy Meadow; they had two sons and were divorced in 2009. In 2016, he married Lisa Damiani; the wedding ceremony was held at the Mandarin Oriental in New York City.

Hochfelder funded the development of the NYC Parenting Center which aids first-time mothers in need. Hochfelder has developed low-income housing in New York and Philadelphia. He has contributed to HELP USA, and has been an active coach in youth sports in Manhattan. Hochfelder was featured in the NYC Skyscraper Museum and has been honored by several national charities for his involvement and contributions to multiple causes.
