= Marvin Middlemark =

Marvin P. Middlemark
- Born: September 16, 1919; New York City
- Died: 1989 (aged 69–70)
- Occupation: Inventor

Marvin P. Middlemark (September 16, 1919 – September 14, 1989) invented the Rabbit Ears television antenna (dipole antenna) in 1953 in Rego Park, Queens, New York.

Marvin P. Middlemark revolutionized how television was watched in the United States, as his Rabbit Ears increased the television signal reception made available to the mass market; this move is considered by many as the single most important reason for the television boom of the late 1950s – 1960s.

== His inventions ==
Marvin P. Middlemark held several patents for his inventions; many were lesser known than his famed Rabbit Ears, such as: a water-powered potato peeler (which failed because when done, a large potato was reduced down to the size of a large marble) and a tennis ball rejuvenator that was designed to bring the bounce back to used tennis balls.

In the mid-1960s, NASA turned to Middlemark to develop the technology needed that would allow the original Apollo missions to communicate from the Moon Lander to Mission control. Middlemark was able to solve this problem, unfortunately NASA was not able to use the same theoretical principles of his dipole antenna.

== Philanthropist ==
Middlemark donated millions to various educational foundations and trusts in a goal to give under-privileged students the ability to attend college. He was also known as a major giver to the New York area homeless shelters and at the time of his death 15,000 pairs of gloves which he personally ordered from China were delivered as his final act of giving.

At the time of his death in 1989, the inventor's mansion in Old Westbury, New York was home to a collection that included two cathedral-size buildings on his property to display his collection of religious stained glass windows and even commissioned pieces displaying the likenesses of Marilyn Monroe and Albert Einstein. Middlemark was also an animal enthusiast, as his lifetime hobbies included Belmont-winning race horses, nine miniature horses (Middlemark is credited with the introduction of the miniature horses and miniature donkeys into the United States, bringing them in from Argentina), and even a chimpanzee named "Josie" who lived in an oversized cage in the basement of Middlemark's house and was known to answer the front door of his home and got soused at parties. Source: NY Times article.

== See also ==
- Dipole antenna
- Television

== Patents ==
- U.S. patent 3,961,332 Elongated television receiving antenna for indoor use, filed July 24, 1975, issued June 1, 1976.
- U.S. patent 3,478,361 Indoor Television Antenna with Rotatable Rings , filed October 9, 1968, issued November 1969.
