= Harris C. Fahnestock =

American investment banker (1835–1914)

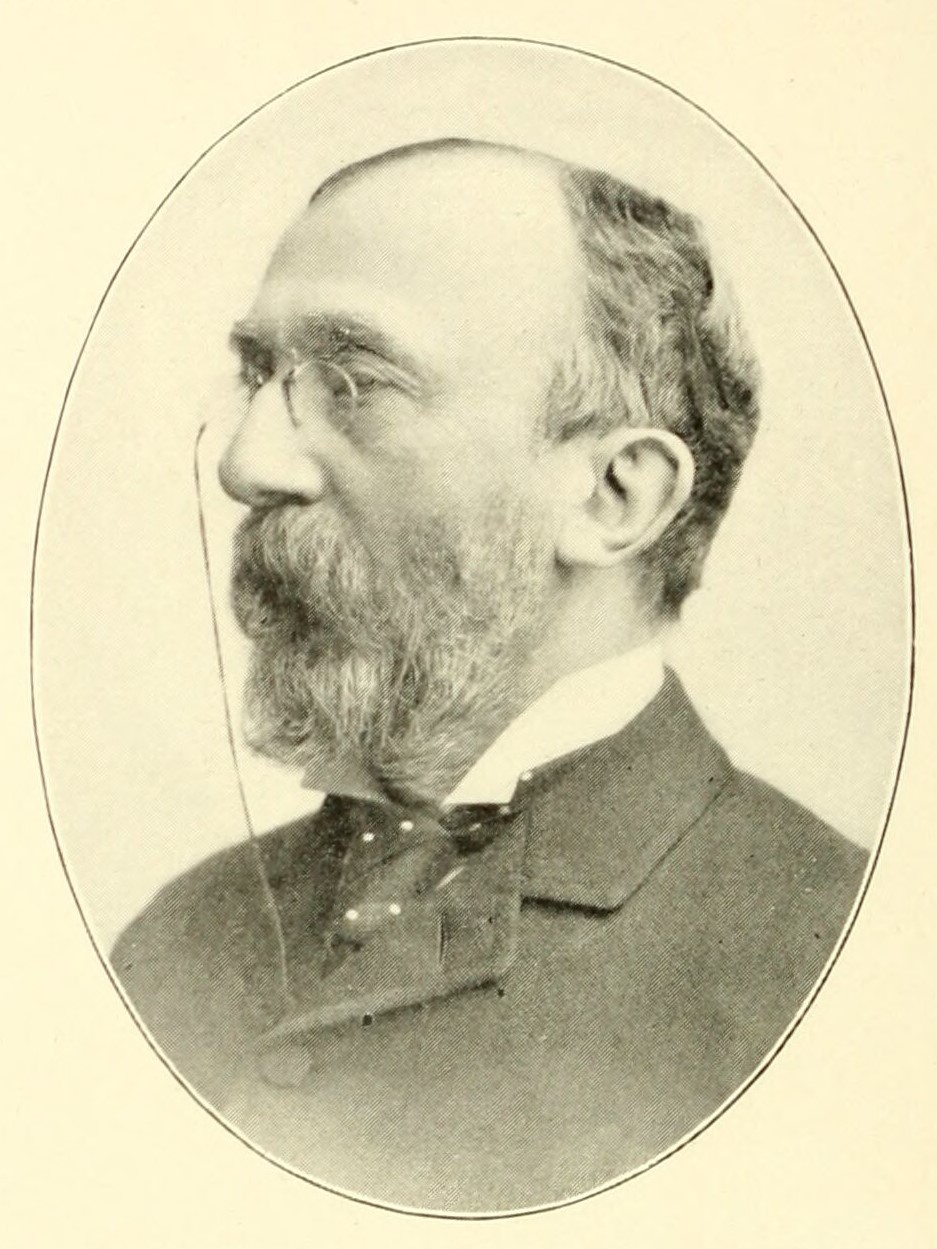
- Born: Harris Charles Fahnestock; February 27, 1835; Harrisburg, Pennsylvania, US
- Died: June 4, 1914 (aged 79); New York City, US
- Spouse: Margaret A. McKinley

Harris Charles Fahnestock (February 27, 1835 – June 4, 1914) was an American investment banker.

== Early life ==
Fahnestock was born on February 27, 1835, in Harrisburg in Dauphin County, Pennsylvania. He was a son of Adam Konigmacher Fahnestock (1806–1887) and Sibyl Thompson (née Holbrook) Fahnestock (1811–1851), who owned a store in Harrisburg. Among his siblings was Edward Morris Fahnestock and Louis Fahnestock. He was a direct descendant of Johann Diedrich Fahnestock, who came to America from Germany in 1726, settling near Ephrata, Pennsylvania.

He was formally educated at the Harrisburg Academy through age 16, while working for his father, before he began at the Harrisburg National Bank as a teller.

== Career ==
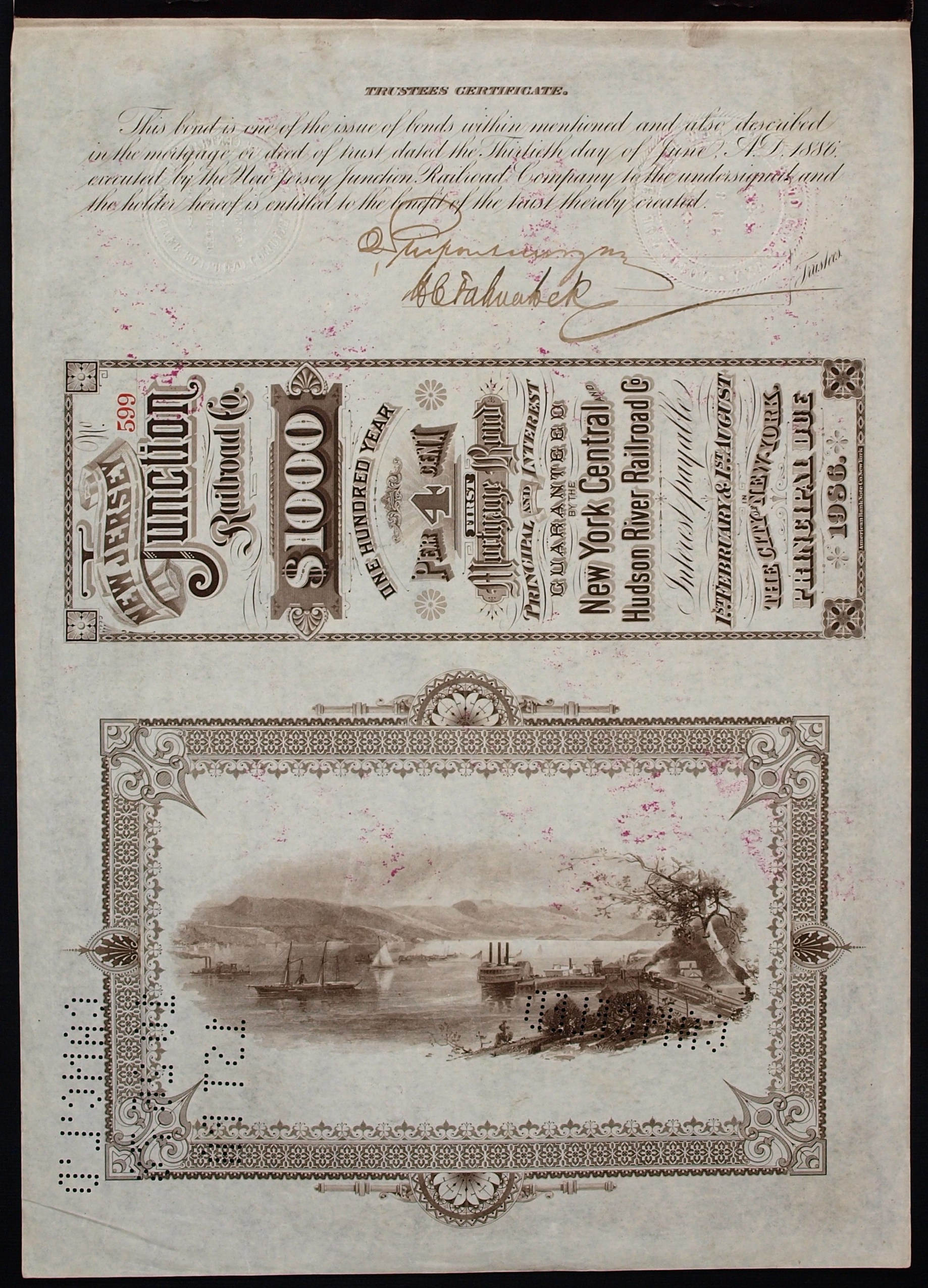
Bond of the New Jersey Junction Railroad Company, issued 30. June 1886, reverse site with signatures of J. Pierpont Morgan and Harris C. Fahnestock as trustees

In 1861, he became a partner of Jay Cooke in the banking firm of Jay Cooke & Company, based in Washington, D.C. where he attracted attention "by negotiating for large war loans during the Civil War." While in Washington, he began his interest in railroads, becoming treasurer of the Washington & Georgetown Line before moving to New York City in 1866 as a member of Jay Cooke, McCulloch & Co., alongside Cooke and Hugh McCulloch (the former Comptroller of the Currency under Lincoln). He was with the firm until its collapse during the Panic of 1873.

After Jay Cooke, McCulloch & Co. failed, Fahnestock made an arrangement with John Thompson and his son, Samuel, then president of the First National Bank of New York, by which he took charge of the bond department immediately with the agreement that in 1877, he would be elected vice president and director of the bank and assume control of the bank from the Thompson family (who then founded Chase National Bank in 1877), the same year George F. Baker was elected president. Fahnestock led First National Bank, a predecessor to Citigroup, for twenty-five until his death in 1914. He also served as a director of the Southern Railway, the Delaware, Lackawanna and Western Railroad, the Central Railroad of New Jersey, the American Cotton Oil Company (a predecessor company to Hellmann's and Best Foods, now part of Unilever), and the Western Union Telegraph Company.

Fahnestock & Co. was founded on May 11, 1881, by his son William Fahnestock, Joseph T. Brown and H. C. Fahnestock as special member. In 1936, the firm took over the business of H.L. Horton & Co., and eventually led to creation of Oppenheimer & Co. in 1950.

=== Philanthropy ===
Fahnestock donated $50,000 towards the construction of the west arch or "crossing" of the Cathedral of St. John the Divine in Upper Manhattan. In addition to serving as a trustee and treasurer of the Metropolitan Museum of Art, and a member and patron of the American Museum of Natural History, he was a benefactor of the Post-Graduate Hospital, to which he donated a significant amount after the death of his wife in 1898, including $100,000 for a Nurses' Training School in 1899.

== Personal life ==
Fahnestock married Margaret A. McKinley (1835–1898), a daughter of Isaac G. McKinley, also of Harrisburg. Together, they were the parents of five boys and a girl.

Margaret died on December 22, 1898. Fahnestock died on June 4, 1914, at his home, 457 Madison Avenue in Manhattan (which was owned by Random House in 1968 and today is site to Municipal Art Society), after "two weeks' illness from erysipelas and a complication of diseases". He was buried at Woodlawn Cemetery in the Bronx.

=== Descendants and legacy ===
The Fahnestocks were parents of six offspring:

- William F. Fahnestock (1857–1936), who married Julia Strong Goetchius. He built Bois Doré in Newport, Rhode Island.
- Gibson Fahnestock (1859–1917), who married Carolyn Snowden Andrews, a daughter of Confederate commander Richard Snowden Andrews.
- Harris Fahnestock (1869–1939), who married Mabel Estelle Metcalf (1870–1930) in 1896. After her death, he married Georgette (née Gérard-Varet) Hyde (1897–1968), daughter of Louis Gérard-Varet (head of the University of Rennes), in 1937.
- Helen Fahnestock (1872–1955), who married Dr. Clarence Gordon Campbell (1868–1956) in 1896. They divorced in 1922 and she married John Hubbard (1870–1933) in 1928.
- Clarence Fahnestock (1873–1918), who married Marguerite Sawyer, a member of the Lodge family of Boston, in 1906. His estate in Cold Spring, known as Clear Lake, was considered one of the finest in America.
- Ernest Fahnestock (1876–1937), who married Georgette Henriette (née DeGrove) Perry (1873–1957), the widow of merchant Edward Perry, in 1905. His estate was valued at $3,613,625 in 1941.

In 1929 Dr. Ernest Fahnestock, donated about 2,400 acres (9.7 km^{2}) as a memorial to his brother Clarence, who died in the post-World War I Influenza epidemic of 1918 while treating patients with the disease. Today, the 14,337 acres (58.02 km^{2}) park is known as the Clarence Fahnestock State Park in Putnam and Dutchess Counties in New York.

Harris Fahnestock's grandson William Fahnestock was at age 23 the youngest member of the New York Stock Exchange and later senior partner of Fahnestock & Co. William's second wife, Mrs. Eppes (née Hawes) Moore, was a daughter of U.S. Senator from Missouri, Harry B. Hawes.

Through his son Harris, Harris C. Fahnestock was a grandfather of Ruth Fahnestock (1908–1974), who married A. Coster Schermerhorn in 1926. They divorced (he married and divorced romance novelist Ursula Parrott) and in 1937, Ruth married Count Alfred de Marigny. They also divorced and Marigny married Nancy Oakes in 1942. In 1943, he was arrested, tried, and acquitted of murdering his father-in-law Sir Harry Oakes.
