= Marguerite Sawyer Davis =

Marguerite Sawyer Hill Davis (March 31, 1879 - March 18, 1948) was one of the wealthiest women in the United States in the mid-1900s. One of her husbands, James Norman Hill, was a son of James J. Hill, a railroad tycoon. She was an art patron, socialite, and heiress to a railroad fortune.

== Early life ==
Marguerite, also known as Margaret, was the daughter of Arthur Wilkinson Sawyer, of Massachusetts Institute of Technology class of 1872, and Caroline Lodge Sawyer. She had a sister and two brothers.

She was born into a wealthy family. Marguerite attended Miss Claggett's School as a young girl and then traveled throughout Europe with a governess for one year. Her father was the son of Joseph Sawyer, a millionaire part-owner of E. R. Mudge, Sawyer & Company, one of the country's most important dry goods commission houses of the time. Arthur was in business with his father before becoming the Boston Young Men's Christian Association president, a position he held for two years. He retired to the Pacific Coast and Hawaiian Islands.

== Adulthood ==
Marguerite Sawyer was first married to Dr. Clarence Fahnestock on June 5, 1906 in Marion, Massachusetts. His parents were Margaret A. (McKinley) and banker Harris C. Fahnestock. Clarence was a physician and big game hunter. The Fahnestocks divorced, and Marguerite went to Europe. Clarence gave up his practice in New York to join the army during World War I and became the chief surgeon for the 301st Infantry with service in France. He died there of pneumonia in 1918.

Marguerite Sawyer Fahnestock married James Norman "Jimmy" Hill (born 1870), the son of railroad tycoon James J. Hill. Hill was the vice-president of Great Northern Railway in 1905, trustee of Great Northern Iron Ore Properties, and president of United Securities Company of St. Paul. The couple were married in London on August 23, 1912 at a Registry Office and then in Savory at the Chapel Royal. The wedding was a quiet ceremony that was not attended by any of Hill's family members. Marguerite wore a large picture hat and a traveling costume. The wife of Admiral Swinburne was one of the half dozen people who attended the wedding. They had a luncheon celebration with the wedding party and Mr. and Mrs. De Lancey Nicoll at Claridge's. The Hills honeymooned on an automobile trip down the south coast of England from Margate. Her sister Pauline married James' brother, Walter.

Marguerite was never received by her in-laws at the family home in Saint Paul, Minnesota, "apparently because she was a divorcee." James J. Hill's wife, Mary Theresa (Mehegan) Hill, was a Roman Catholic. James Norman Hill became quite wealthy independently owing to his investment in Texas Company, later Texaco. He and Marguerite owned Big Tree Farm on Wheatley Road in Brookville, New York on Long Island. Walker & Gillette designed the building and the landscaping was designed by the Olmsted Brothers. On their 230-acre estate, they bred Holstein and Ayrshire cattle, grew 769 species of trees, and had three large duck ponds. The Hill's interests included arboriculture, gardening, horses, tennis, shooting and golf. The Hill home at Wheatley Hills, New York, considered one of the East Coast's show places, was the site of lavish events. They were on the Social Register.

According to a census, the Hills had at least one child, Marguerite, named after her mother; the child died in her youth. James Norman Hill died in 1932 and Marguerite, his wife, was said to have been left with an estate estimated at $80 million, but she was only left $2 million of the Hill fortune. Her husband was buried at the James Norman Hill mausoleum in Woodland Cemetery in Bronx, New York. Marguerite grew the money she was left from her husband from $2 to $9 million, she said, by the efforts of her financial adviser and common sense.

Marguerite next married Herbert Neal, a descendant of John Adams, on October 3, 1933 in Elkton, Maryland. He worked for Standard Oil Company of New York for 20 years. They spent their honeymoon in South America, France, and Spain. Shortly after, she returned from a trip to Honolulu and found that Herbert Neal was staying with another woman in a New Orleans Hotel. They were divorced in 1937. After the divorce, she resumed the name Marguerite Hill. She then entertained at Big Tree Farm in New York, Palm Beach, and in Washington, D.C. and dated a number of society men. She was good friends and vacationed with David S. Cowles, Baron George Wrangall, and Jean Saint Cyr. Wrangall had given a toast to her, "the most glorious woman in the world." On Long Island, she favored clam bakes and sometimes had impromptu parties that lasted a week. She had a large collection of jewelry featuring diamonds, emeralds, rubies, sapphires, and other gems; the collection was stolen from her jewel safe at the Big Tree Farm in October 1942. The collection including heirloom pieces, and was worth at least $350,000 (equivalent to $6,896,640 in 2025), but she soon began to rebuild a collection.

In 1946, Marguerite married Blevins Davis at the Mayflower Hotel in Washington, D.C. The ceremony was attended by Bess Truman. The Harry S. Truman family had been neighbors and lifelong friends of her husband. After the wedding, the couple took the ship America to Europe for their honeymoon.

== Death and legacy ==
Marguerite Davis died at St. Luke's Hospital in Kansas City, Missouri on March 18, 1948, following a heart attack. She was 68 years old.

She had set up a trust so that $2,750,000 of her fortune was used for charitable purposes. Her jewelry went to friends and relatives, except for her wedding ring that stayed on her finger, and some of her servants received $10,000. She was entombed in the James Norman Hill mausoleum in Woodland Cemetery in Bronx, New York, where she also intended her husband would be buried.

A portion of her fortune went to the Poor Sisters of St. Francis (Sisters of St. Francis of Perpetual Adoration) when they bought the Modern Woodmen Sanatorium and Trianon in Colorado Springs, Colorado for $1 in 1952. The combined fortune that they received was worth $2,325,000 (equivalent to $27,874,071 in 2025).

The Big Tree Farm in Wheatley Hills, Long Island has operated as the Children's Education Center for the AHRC Nassau since 1968.
