= C. Z. Guest =

American actress, author, horsewoman, designer and socialite (1920–2003)

C.Z. Guest
- Guest in 1956
- Born: Lucy Douglas Cochrane; February 19, 1920; Boston, Massachusetts, U.S.
- Died: November 8, 2003 (aged 83); Old Westbury, New York, U.S.
- Occupations: Stage actress, socialite, author, columnist, horsewoman, fashion designer
- Political party: Republican
- Spouse: Winston Frederick Churchill Guest (m. 1947; died 1982)
- Children: 2, including Cornelia

Lucy Douglas "C.Z." Guest (née Cochrane; February 19, 1920 – November 8, 2003) was an American actress, author, columnist, horsewoman, fashion designer, and socialite who achieved a degree of fame as a fashion icon. She was frequently seen wearing elegant designs by designers like Mainbocher. Her unfussy, clean-cut style was seen as typically American, and she was named to the International Best Dressed Hall of Fame List in 1959.

== Life and career ==
She was born on February 19, 1920, in Boston, Massachusetts to Vivian Hervey Wessell and Alexander Lynde Cochrane, an investment banker who belonged to a family of Boston Brahmins. Her brother called her Sissy, and she transformed that into C.Z. She had two sisters, Nancy (née Cochrane) Palmer of Johns Island, Florida and Jean "Neenie" (née Cochrane) Cameron Welch of Knockbrack Grange, near Oldcastle in County Meath, Ireland.

In 1937, she was presented as a debutante and, in 1939, she was voted the "Glamor Girl of the Massachusetts North Shore in a beauty contest which prompted her to have a stint as a showgirl. She dabbled in acting, including an appearance in the Ziegfeld Follies in 1944.

On March 8, 1947, she married Winston Frederick Churchill Guest, a U.S. national polo champion and the son of Frederick Guest, who was a son of Ivor Bertie Guest, 1st Baron Wimborne, and Lady Cornelia Henrietta Maria Spencer-Churchill (daughter of John Spencer-Churchill, 7th Duke of Marlborough) and who, through his mother, was a first cousin of Sir Winston Churchill. Ernest Hemingway was best man at the wedding, which took place at Hemingway's home in Havana, Cuba. The couple had two children, Alexander Guest and Cornelia Guest. C.Z. Guest was pictured on the cover of the July 20, 1962, issue of Time magazine as part of an article on American society.

After a horse riding accident in 1976, Guest was asked by the New York Post to write a column on gardening. Her first book, First Garden, was illustrated by her friend Cecil Beaton. Other friends included Truman Capote, Sawai Man Singh II of Jaipur, Barbara Hutton, Diana Vreeland, Babe Paley and William S. Paley, Gloria Guinness and Thomas "Loel" Guinness, and the Duke and Duchess of Windsor, who were the godparents of their children.

She was painted by Diego Rivera, Salvador Dalí, Kenneth Paul Block, and Andy Warhol.

In 1985, she designed a small fashion collection consisting mainly of cashmere sweaters that was introduced at a show of the Cuban-born American designer Adolfo, well known for dressing Nancy Reagan and Babe Paley. In 1986, she expanded her design work to include a limited line of sportswear sold under license, and, in 1990, she came out with a fragrant insect repellent and other garden merchandise.

From October 15, 2026 – February 21, 2027, the SCAD FASH Museum of Fashion + Film exhibited C.Z. Guest: Portrait of an American Style Icon displaying items from her personal wardrobe and featuring "some of the most prolific fashion designers of the 20th century, many of whom were championed by Guest throughout her life" as well as photos and illustrations of her.

== Death ==
Guest died on November 8, 2003, in Old Westbury, New York, at the age of 83, as a friend was driving her to the hospital after she experienced breathing difficulties at home.
