= Arielle Charnas =

American fashion blogger and influencer

- Born: Arielle Noa Nachmani; June 13, 1987 (age 39)
- Occupations: Fashion blogger; Influencer; Designer
- Website: somethingnavy.com

Arielle Noa Charnas (née Nachmani; born June 13, 1987) is an American fashion blogger and influencer known for her blog Something Navy, launched in 2009. She designed a line of apparel in partnership with Nordstrom, and following its success, she started a clothing brand called Something Navy in 2020. She gained attention for series of controversies during the COVID-19 pandemic and for the subsequent backlash from Nordstrom.

== Early life ==
Charnas was raised in Old Westbury, New York, on Long Island to a Jewish family. She graduated from Syracuse University in 2009.

== Career ==
=== Influencer and blogger ===
In 2009, Charnas began posting photos of her outfits and showcasing her personal style online on a blog named Something Navy. Initially, the posts were to impress an ex-boyfriend. She describes her personal style as "elevated basic".

Before her blog gained in popularity, Charnas worked at a Theory store in the Meatpacking District. She later signed a four-year endorsement deal with TRESemmé and appeared in television ads for the shampoo brand that began airing in January 2016.

=== Nordstrom partnership ===
Charnas later launched her first collection of apparel with Nordstrom in fall 2017. Her first fashion line named Something Navy X Treasure & Bond was launched on September 25, 2017, in 52 Nordstrom stores across the United States and Canada. The collection included 30 ready-to-wear outfits, including shoes and accessories. Sales online exceeded over a million dollars in the first 24 hours.

In February 2018, Charnas signed a long-term contract with Nordstrom to license Something Navy and her likeness, as well as establish a stand-alone brand. In March 2018, a single Instagram story promoting Bandier, an activewear retailer in which Charnas owns a small stake, generated more than $207,000 in sales in just four hours. In September 2018, Something Navy released Charnas' second collection of apparel with Nordstrom, and the first under the standalone brand. On the launch date, high traffic temporarily shut down the Nordstrom website an hour after the collection's release, but sales for the day reached $4 to $5 million. In August 2019, it was announced that Charnas raised $10 million in funding from investors, valuing the Something Navy brand at nearly $45 million.

On April 2, 2020, Nordstrom further disassociated themselves with her brand due to her actions related to the COVID-19 pandemic. They stated: "Our partnership with Arielle Charnas ended in 2019, and we have no foreseeable collaborations".

=== Something Navy clothing brand ===
In July 2020, Charnas launched Something Navy without Nordstrom. She hired Matthew Scanlan as CEO, and his company Nadaam Inc. owns 20%. Charnas served as chief creative officer. The company opened stores in Dallas, New York and Los Angeles. Something Navy received a $10 million of funding from Silas Chou's Vanterra Capital fund, which valued the Something Navy business at about $45 million. According to Scanlan, Something Navy had $12 million in sales during its first six months. In 2021, Forbes projected Something Navy to grow by a factor of 300. Scanlan says that Something Navy did $24 million in sales in 2022.

In late 2022, the celebrity gossip Instagram account DeuxMoi posted unvetted allegations about Arielle and Something Navy, sparking extensive online gossip on Reddit and other social media. On December 8, 2022, Business Insider published an article that made several claims about the company's apparent struggles. The article claimed that Something Navy owed hundreds of thousands of dollars to vendors, suppliers, and freelancers and that it had lost almost half of its employees within the last year. According to a spokesperson from Something Navy, the payments were completed by the time of the article's fact-check. Business Insider reported that CEO Matthew Scanlan had shielded Charnas from the day-to-day operations. The article was behind a paywall and prompted "thousands" of signups to Business Insider, according to Vanity Fair.

Charnas posted on social media that Something Navy planned to open at least ten more locations, but the plans were never fulfilled. In 2023, the company closed its stores and stopped posting on social media. Wall Street Journal reported in December 2023 that Something Navy was being sold in a "fire sale." According to the brand's term sheet, it is offloading "$7.5 million in liabilities and $483,000 worth of outstanding bills." The consideration of the purchase was listed at $1. Some reports said that IHL Group, which has a portfolio of brands including Aéropostale, was interested in purchasing Something Navy.

== Personal life ==
Charnas married Brandon Charnas, a lawyer and real estate advisor on October 18, 2014, in Fisher Island, Florida. The couple has three daughters, who she frequently features on social media. She lives on the Upper East Side of New York City and frequently travels to The Hamptons and South Florida.
