= Winston Frederick Churchill Guest =

American polo player

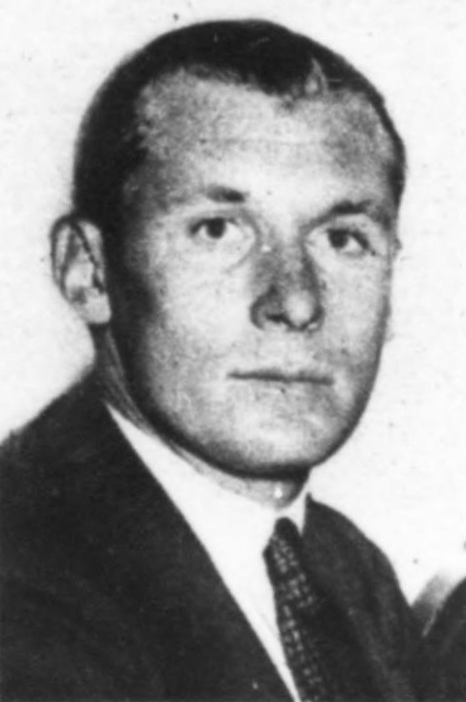
- Guest c. 1934
- Born: May 20, 1906; New York, New York, U.S.
- Died: October 25, 1982 (aged 76); Mineola, New York, U.S.
- Education: Yale University; Columbia University Law School
- Occupations: Polo player, racehorse owner/breeder
- Spouses: Helena Woolworth McCann (m. 1934; div. 1944) Lucy Douglas Cochrane (m. 1947)
- Children: 4, including Cornelia Guest
- Parent(s): Frederick E. Guest; Amy Phipps
- Relatives: Raymond R. Guest (brother); Diana Guest Manning (sister); Ivor Guest (grandfather); Henry Phipps, Jr. (grandfather)

Winston Frederick Churchill Guest (May 20, 1906 – October 25, 1982) was an Anglo-American polo champion and a member of the Guest family of Britain.

== Early life ==
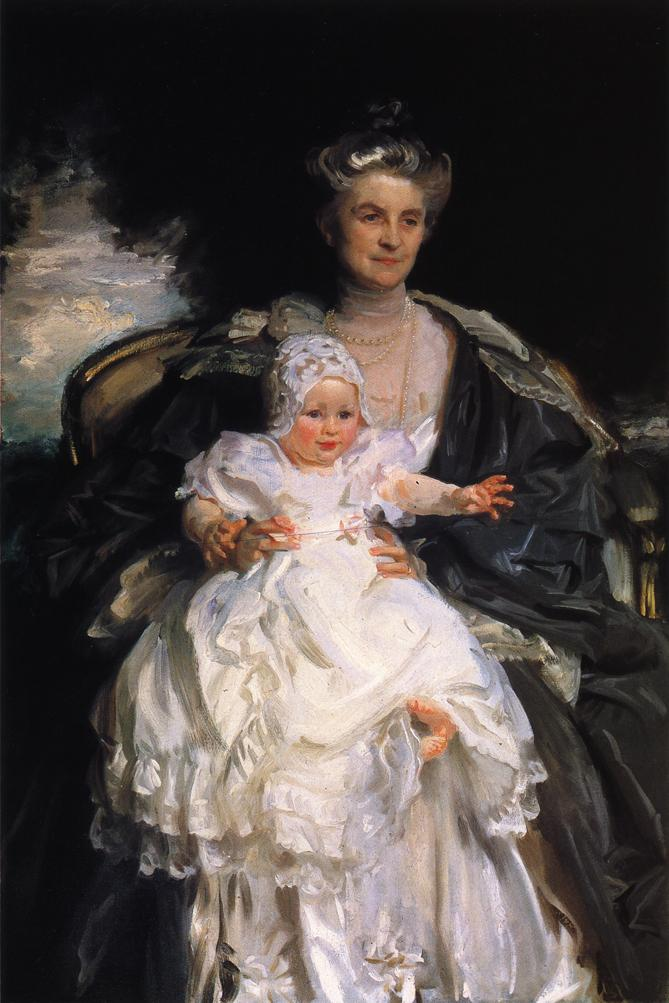
Portrait with his grandmother, Mrs. Henry Phipps, by John Singer Sargent c. 1907

Winston Frederick Churchill Guest was born on May 20, 1906, to Frederick Guest (1875–1937), a British politician, and Amy Phipps. His mother was the daughter of Henry Phipps, Jr., an American businessman and philanthropist. His paternal grandfather was Ivor Guest, 1st Baron Wimborne (1835–1914), a Welsh industrialist. His paternal grandmother was Cornelia Guest, Baroness Wimborne, a philanthropist in Dorset, England. His great-grandfather was John Spencer-Churchill, 7th Duke of Marlborough, making him a first cousin once removed of British Prime Minister Winston Churchill.

His brother, Raymond R. Guest (1907–1991), was the United States Ambassador to Ireland from 1965 to 1968, who married three times.

In 1918, during World War I, his mother turned over their London home, Alford House on Park Lane, to be used by the American Red Cross as a hospital for the American Navy. In 1919, his parents entered into a separation agreement and his mother received custody of him, thereafter living in the United States. He graduated from Yale University in 1927 and received a law degree from Columbia University in 1942.

== Career ==
After graduating from Columbia University Law School, he was appointed law secretary for Joseph C. Baldwin III, minority leader of the Board of Alderman. He, along with Alexander Hamilton, a descendant of Alexander Hamilton, the first Treasury Secretary, was paid $1 a year for his work.

=== Polo ===
Guest was a member of the international team of the United States which won the International Polo Cup in 1930, 1936 and 1939. He was the only player in the history of the Indoor Polo Association with the top rating of ten goals.

In 1934, while being the highest rated player of indoor polo, he was elected the head of Indoor Polo Association. Along with him came Elbridge T. Gerry as executive vice president and Michael G. Phipps as vice president.

== Personal life ==
In 1934, Guest married Helena Woolworth McCann, daughter of Charles E. F. McCann and Helena Maud Woolworth McCann (1878–1938). Her maternal grandfather was F. W. Woolworth, the American business magnate. She attended Miss Hewitt's School, Miss Chapin's School, and graduated from Miss Porter's School in Farmington, Connecticut. They subsequently divorced in 1944. With her, his two sons:

- Winston Alexander Guest (b. 1936), who married Helen Mane Elizabeth Shields in 1967.
- Frederick Edward Guest II (1938-2021), who married Stephanie Wanger (b. 1943), daughter of Walter Wanger and Joan Bennett, in 1963. They divorced and he married Carole Baldoff in 1988.

In 1947, Guest married Lucy Douglas Cochrane (1920-2003), later known as C. Z. Guest. With her, he had a son and a daughter:

- Alexander Michael Douglas Cochrane Guest (b. 1954), who married Elizabeth Geacintov, a daughter of Dr. Cyril Geacintov (a former president of Russian Nobility Association in America), in 1986.
- Cornelia Cochrane Churchill Guest (b. 1963), a debutante.

In 1947 Guest leased historic Gardiners Island from its 15th owner, Sarah Diodati Gardiner. Guest used it to host hunting parties, inviting high profile guests, like Ernest Hemingway and Dag Hammarskjöld. On January 24, 1947, Van Campen Heilner was staying in the mansion, when a fire swept through the island's 1774 Georgian mansion. Heilner survived by jumping out a window. The mansion was a complete loss.

Winston Guest died on October 25, 1982, at Nassau Hospital in Mineola, New York.

== See also ==
- Phipps family
- Bror von Blixen-Finecke
