= We answer to a higher authority =

Slogan of Hebrew National

We answer to a higher authority is a slogan used by Hebrew National, now a subsidiary of ConAgra Foods, for its brand of kosher-certified hot dogs and processed meats, which portrays the products as being of a higher quality than other, similar products. A 1997 article in The New York Times called the campaign "among the longest running and best known ever".

In a 2009 article The National Hot Dog and Sausage Council cited statistics indicating that three-quarters of the six million Americans who prefer kosher hot dogs are not themselves Jewish. In 2010, The New York Times wrote that Hebrew National's hot dogs "aren't kosher enough for most Jews who keep kosher".

== Advertising campaigns ==
The slogan dates back to 1965, and has been used since then as a means to market the product to Jews and non-Jews as a superior product. Some of the campaign's earliest television advertisements, created by Scali, McCabe, Sloves in 1972, featured Uncle Sam preparing to consume a hot dog that includes the additives and fillers permitted under federal regulations, while an ethereal narrator states that Hebrew National cannot, panning up to the heavens and stating because "we answer to a higher authority", and appeared sporadically for nearly two decades.

A 1992 revision featured a supposed competitor named "Frank Wiener" who must answer to the higher authority himself for producing inferior products that did not match the quality of those manufactured by Hebrew National.

A 1997 campaign developed by New York City firm Grey Advertising featured Robert Klein as an all-knowing hot dog vendor with an ethereally shiny cart, purveying both hot dogs and words of deep wisdom. The campaign played on the nostalgia for the company's earlier television advertisements with a touch of humor. In various spots in the campaign, a single man is guided to his future wife, the finder of a bag full of money is told to return the loot and is rewarded with winning the lottery and a customer who asks if the vendor accepts credit cards is told by the character that "I take credit for everything". The $5 million campaign, double the previous year's budget, would feature ads broadcast in its traditional markets, as well as in cities such as Baltimore, Los Angeles, Phoenix, Arizona and San Francisco, where the products were popular but had not been directly targeted in previous campaigns.
