= Cornelia Guest =

American writer and socialite (born 1963)

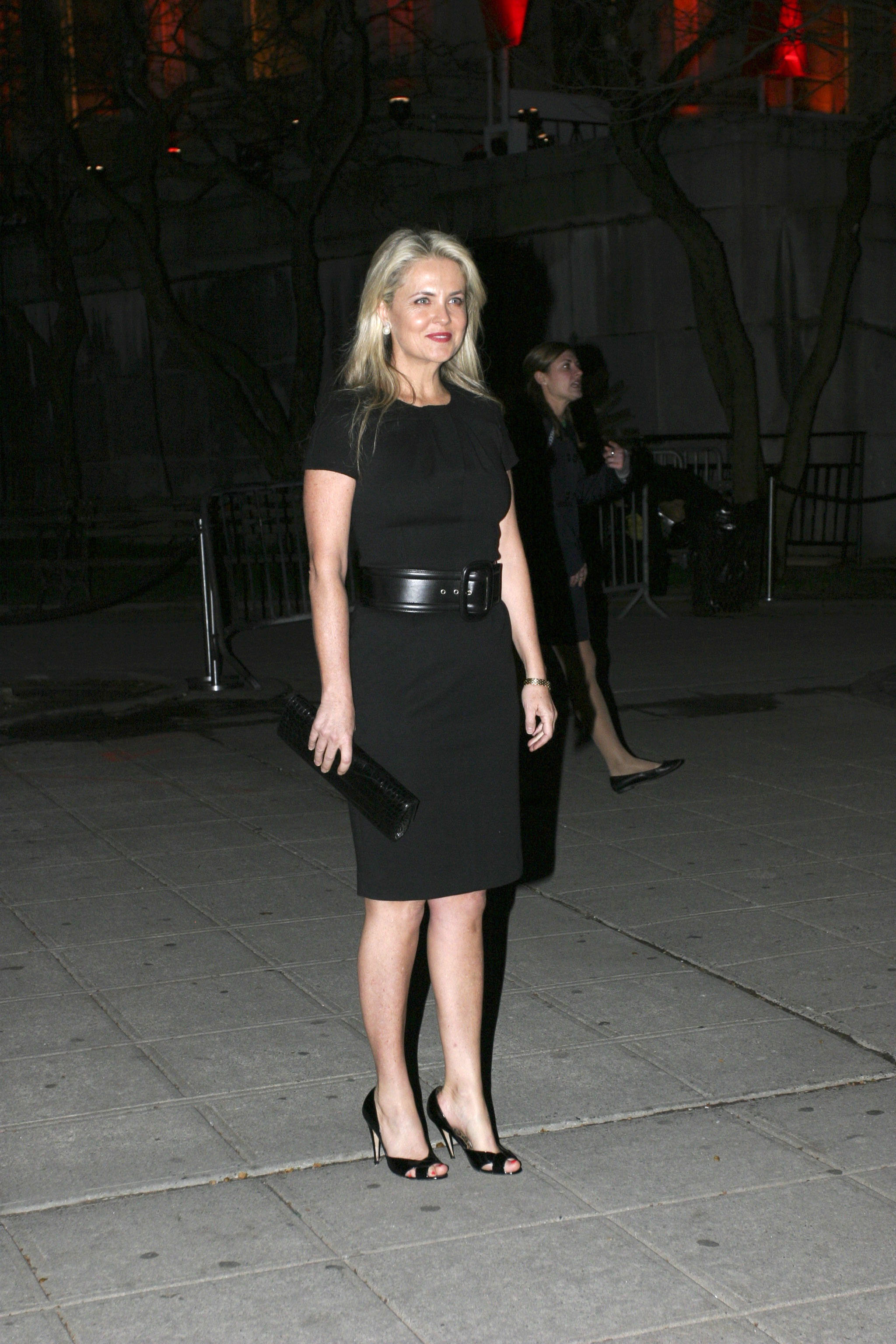
- Born: Cornelia Cochrane Churchill Guest; November 28, 1963 (age 62); New York City
- Education: Foxcroft School
- Occupations: Socialite, author, actress
- Parent(s): Winston Guest; C. Z. Guest
- Relatives: Henry Phipps, Jr. (great-grandfather); Frederick Guest (grandfather); Edward VIII (godfather); Wallis Simpson (godmother)

Cornelia Cochrane Churchill Guest (born November 28, 1963) is a New York socialite, author, actor, and the Debutante of the Decade for the 1980s of the International Debutante Ball in New York City. She is a vegan, and known for her advocacy of animal rights.

== Early life and education ==
Cornelia Cochrane Churchill Guest was born on November 28, 1963, in New York City. Cornelia Guest is the daughter of the British polo champion Winston Guest (1906–1982) and socialite Lucy "C.Z." Douglas Cochrane (1920–2003). She was the fourth and last child for Winston Guest and the second and last of C.Z. Guest's children. She was named for her great-grandmother Lady Cornelia Spencer-Churchill (1847–1927), a daughter of John Spencer-Churchill, 7th Duke of Marlborough. Her godparents were her parents' friends, King Edward VIII (1894–1972) and his wife Wallis, Duchess of Windsor (1896–1986).

Guest attended Foxcroft School, but dropped out at 15 and completed her high-school diploma through a correspondence course. Guest became an accomplished equestrian, like her father, and rode competitively. She continued riding until her mother died in 2003.

=== Debutante years ===
Cornelia made her debut in the winter of 1981–1982 at the International Debutante Ball at the Waldorf-Astoria in New York City. Her 18th birthday party included author Truman Capote (a family friend), Prince Egon von Fürstenberg (1946–2004), supermodel Cheryl Tiegs, John Bowes-Lyon who is Queen Elizabeth’s cousin, Andy Warhol (another childhood friend), make-up artist Way Bandy, heiress and philanthropist Doris Duke, and Jerry Zipkin, a socialite, escort, and confidant of First Lady Nancy Reagan, as guests. Capote, a Guest family friend, explained to People magazine why Guest's soiree attracted so many celebrities, royals, and powerful people: "Cornelia has a No. 1 name. The Guests are from real patrician stock, unlike the Vanderbilts and Rockefellers, who are descended from crooks."

Guest was 1982's Deb of the Year and was named the Deb of the Decade in 1986. The New York Times called her "the first ‘celebutante.’" As the newspaper noted at the time, "Before her, debs were quiet about their ambitions. They aimed to mingle with the equally posh and then marry. Cornelia had different plans: she wanted to be an actress. ‘Cornelia is some number,’ her mother said when Cornelia had left New York for Hollywood. ‘She is a star, and she wants to be a superstar.’"

Guest was a constant presence in the society press and the national news throughout the decade – including a photo shoot in which she appeared "topless in Time magazine, her hands covering her breasts." She appeared in Time, Life, People, New York magazine and The Washington Post. Some were critical of Guest's flamboyance and self-promotion in particular and of the resurgence of debutante balls, with the lavish spending that comes with them, in general.

== Career ==
Soon after the publication of her memoir, Guest headed to Hollywood for an acting career, quickly securing the services of both an agent and a much-in-demand acting coach, Sandra Seacat. Guest scored mostly small roles, beginning in 1989. In the early 2000s, she served as a spokeswoman for the upscale LaPrairie skin-care line.

In 2013, Guest became a member of "Team Guy" on the second season of Food Network's Rachael vs. Guy: Celebrity Cook-Off. In 2017, she appeared in Twin Peaks.

=== Animal rights ===
Guest is a vegan and has been a spokesperson for animal rights. Her line of upscale handbags for Bloomingdale's and 50 other stores includes no leather purses. In 2011, Guest posed nude as part of the ongoing "I’d rather go naked than wear fur" campaign for People for the Ethical Treatment of Animals (PETA).

In August 2015, Guest became Brand Ambassador for Donna Salyers' Fabulous Furs, a Covington, Kentucky-based fashion house which specializes in faux fur clothing and products, and announced plans to release between five and ten designs through the company for the fall 2016 season.

In January 2020, Guest moved to Dallas, Texas, to make a better home for the menagerie of animals she has rescued, including mini horses, donkeys, Guinea hens, a Sulcata tortoise, ducks, chickens, peacocks, cats, and dogs.

Guest serves as a Director on the Board of the Humane Society of New York, an animal adoption center and veterinary clinic.

=== Published works ===
In 1986, she published a memoir, The Debutante's Guide to Life. As part of the book tour for The Debutante's Guide to Life, Guest crooned "It’s My Party and I’ll Cry If I Want To" on Late Night with David Letterman.

In June 2012, Guest published a vegan cookbook and entertaining guide, Cornelia Guest's Simple Pleasures: Healthy Seasonal Cooking & Easy Entertaining. She also launched a vegan catering business in 2010. According to Guests' events website, "the menus are not limited to vegan and vegetarian options."
