= Triangle K =

Kosher certification agency

Hechsher of Triangle K Kosher
- Certifying agency: Triangle K Kosher
- Product category: Food products
- Type of standard: Religious
- Website: trianglek.org

Triangle K is a kosher certification agency headed by Rabbi Aryeh R. Ralbag. It was founded by his father, Rabbi Yehosef Ralbag. The hechsher (symbol of kosher certification) is a letter K enclosed in an equilateral triangle.

== Supervision and certification ==
They supervise a number of major brands, including Del Monte, Hebrew National, Ocean Spray, Sunsweet, Sunny Delight, SunChips and Wonder Bread.

Minute Maid products used to be supervised by Triangle K. Since 2013 the Orthodox Union has been providing kosher certification for Minute Maid products instead.

Many Orthodox Jews eat only meat that is glatt kosher. Triangle K certifies foods as kosher that are not glatt kosher. As a result, many Orthodox Jews will not eat meat & other items that are certified by Triangle K.

== K Meshulash ==
The name K Meshulash is sometimes used in addition to the trademarked Triangle K name. Meshulash means triangle, triple, or tripled in Hebrew.

== Crown Heights Beis Din ==
In 2025, the Crown Heights Beis Din, the central rabbinic court of the central Chabad community in Crown Heights, which runs Crown Heights Kashrus released a statement deeming Triangle K as not acceptable for the community.

== See also ==
- Kosher foods
- Kashrut
