= Sarah Nyberg Pergament =

Swedish electronica artist

- Born: Sarah Nyberg Pergament
- Genres: Electronic
- Occupation: Musician
- Label: Friendly Noise

Sarah Nyberg Pergament is a Swedish electronica artist who releases her music under the name Action Biker, a name given to her project by a friend in its early stages.

After releasing two singles, "Sandy Edwards" in 2002 and "Elephant & Castle" in 2003, her début album Hesperian Puisto was released in 2008 on the Friendly Noise record label. It received a rating of 4/5 in the Swedish morning paper Dagens Nyheter. One of her songs from the album "Love for Sure", also appears in the American TV show The Middleman, which aired the first time in 2008. She is primarily involved in Action Biker but also released an album in 2007 as "The Dreamers" with English artist Kevin Wright, Day for Night.

She also appears on various compilations and has collaborated with various artists such as Differnet, Darren Hanlon, Cocoanut Groove, Sound of Arrows and Axel Willner of The Field among others.

Much of her music is inspired by French sixties soundtracks, Kraftwerk and the BBC Radiophonic Workshop.

== Groups ==
She has been a member of the Flow Flux Clan and The Dreamers.
