= Van Campen Heilner =

American sportsman, and author of works on hunting and fishing

- Born: 1899
- Died: 1970 (aged 70–71); Madrid
- Occupation: author
- Known for: author of popular books on hunting and fishing

Van Campen Heilner (1899–1970) was an American sportsman, and author of works on hunting and fishing. Heilner was born wealthy, his family's wealth, from coal mining, financed his hunting and fishing expeditions around the world.

Heilner's hunting and fishing companions included authors Ernest Hemingway and Zane Grey. Both Hemingway and Grey provided forewords for some of Heilner's books.

In 1920, when he was 21 years old, Heilner became an editor and contributor to Field and Stream magazine. He lived for sometime on the island of Bimini in the Bahamas, B.W.I., and there discovered the charm and thrill of bonefishing. He is regarded on Bimini as the "father" of the island's bonefishing industry.

His 1937 book, Salt Water Fishing, remains a classic.

Heilner was associated with the American Museum of Natural History. His obituary in The New York Times describes Heilner forming the theory that most sharks were harmless, and then proving it by swimming with many species of sharks, without harm.

Heilner was a co-founder, and vice president of the International Game Fish Association.

On January 24, 1947, Heilner was staying overnight in the 173-year-old mansion on historic Gardiners Island. He was the sole occupant of the mansion, when it was swept by a devastating fire, that totally consumed the structure. He barely escaped by jumping from a second floor window.

== Bibliography ==
- Van Campen Heilner (1941). Our American Game Birds. Garden City Publishing Company.
- Van Campen Heilner (1943). Salt Water Fishing. Knopf Publishing.
- Van Campen Heilner (1930). Beneath the Southern Cross. R.G. Badger.
- Van Campen Heilner (1922). Adventures in Angling - A Book of Salt Water Fishing. Read Books Design. ISBN 9781446021484.
- Van Campen Heilner (1949). Our American Game Birds. Garden City Publishing Company.
- Van Campen Heilner (30 October 2012). A Book on Duck Shooting. Read Books. ISBN 9781447499046.
