= Leonard Pines =

Leonard Pines (born Leonard Pinckowitz; 1911 – July 2001) was a businessman who expanded Hebrew National Kosher Foods and introduced deli meats packaged for supermarkets.

== Hebrew National Kosher Foods, Inc. ==
His most notable accomplishment was turning his Romanian immigrant father's business from selling deli meats out of a wagon into Hebrew National Kosher Foods, an industry leader. Leonard's revolutionary innovation consisted of packaging deli meats specifically for supermarkets. This successfully expanded his customer base beyond Kosher Jews to the general public.

Leonard took over Hebrew National in 1935. He used a variety of promotions to expand sales to non-Jewish markets. For instance, a humorous ad campaign from the 1940s featured a boy balancing a gigantic salami on his head. The caption read: For a well-balanced meal. Another example of his innovative marketing from 1965, was when the company advertised that it answered to a higher authority. The slogan quickly became a symbol for quality, appealing to Jews and non-Jews alike.

== Author ==
Leonard Pines was also a comedic author. He wrote "Hot Dog Jokes; Told with Relish" in 1976. A Tempo Books Original, it was published by Grosset & Dunlap, Inc in America and Canada Simultaneously and retailed for $.95.

== Personal life ==
Leonard married his first wife, Mary Zucker, in 1932. They were married for 48 years until her death in 1980. Soon after he married his second wife, Jeanette Brooks. Leonard never remarried after Jeanette's death in 1999. He died in July 2001. He was survived by two daughters, Myrna Chase and Paula Pines and two sons, Isidore and Kenny Pines.
