= Pergament Home Centers =

American retail chain

- Industry: Home improvement
- Founded: 1935; 91 years ago in Franklin Square, New York, United States
- Founder: Louis Pergament
- Defunct: 2001
- Fate: Bankruptcy
- Parent: Mancuso & Co.

Pergament Home Centers was a home improvement store chain with stores in New York, New Jersey, and Connecticut. It specialized in the sale of flooring, paint, and wallpaper and was one of the first in the area to sell acrylic paint. At its zenith, the chain had 42 stores and sales of $375 million.

In 2001, after facing stiff competition from The Home Depot and Lowe's, the company filed bankruptcy and shut down.

== History ==
The company had its roots in a store opened in 1935 by Louis Pergament in Franklin Square, New York.

In 1989, Mancuso & Co., owned by Robert F. Mancuso, and Equitable Capital Management acquired the company from the founding family for as much as $175 million (~$384 million in 2024) via a leveraged buyout. Equitable Capital Management invested over $11 million in the acquisition. Michael H. Lurie became president and chief operating officer.

In 1992, the company was restructured, including layoffs and store closings. Control of the company wound up in the hands of its lender, Westdeutsche Landesbank.

In 1998, the company closed its last store in Connecticut.

In 2001, after facing stiff competition from The Home Depot and Lowe's, the company filed bankruptcy and shut down.

In 2013, Bob Pergament, the son of the founder, told his memoirs about the chain.
