= Ogden Mills Reid =

American newspaper publisher (1882–1947)

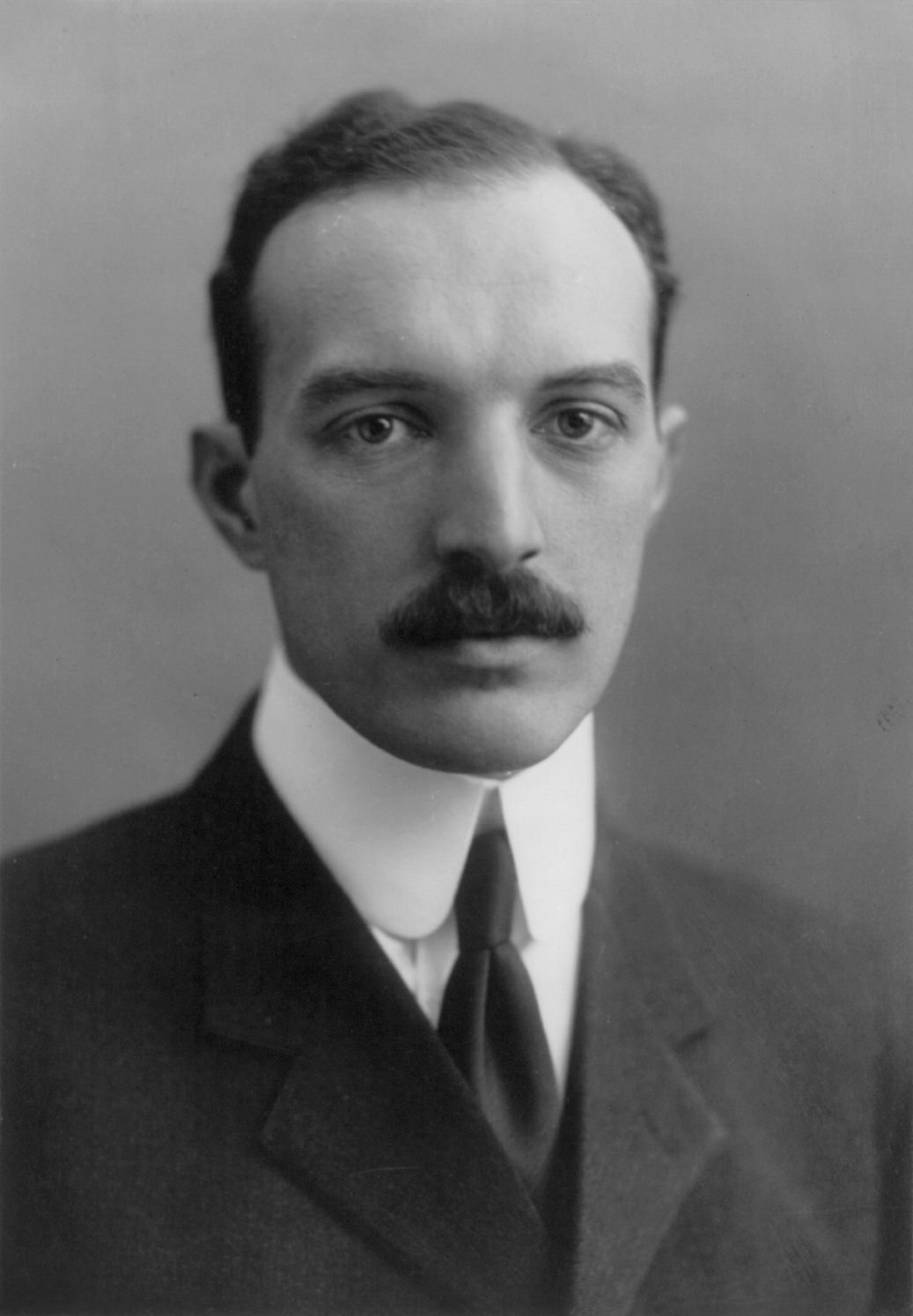
- Reid, c. 1912
- Born: May 16, 1882; New York City, U.S.
- Died: January 3, 1947 (aged 64); New York City, U.S.
- Education: University of Bonn; Yale University
- Spouse: Helen Miles Rogers (m. 1911)
- Children: 3, including Whitelaw, Ogden
- Parent(s): Whitelaw Reid; Elisabeth Mills Reid
- Relatives: Jean Templeton Ward (sister); Ogden L. Mills (cousin); Gladys L. Mills (cousin); Jane B. Mills (cousin); Darius Ogden Mills (grandfather); Ogden Mills (uncle)

Ogden Mills Reid (May 16, 1882 – January 3, 1947) was an American newspaper publisher who was president of the New York Herald Tribune.

== Early life ==
Reid was born on May 16, 1882, in Manhattan. He was the son of Elisabeth Mills Reid (1857–1931) and Whitelaw Reid (1837–1912), the U.S. Ambassador to Great Britain and France and 1892 Republican vice presidential candidate. His sister was Jean Templeton Reid, who married Sir John Hubert Ward, the son of William Ward, 1st Earl of Dudley, in 1908.

His maternal grandfather was Darius Ogden Mills, at one time the richest man in California, and his uncle was Ogden Mills, a prominent New York Society man. Through his uncle, he was a cousin of twins Gladys Livingston Mills, the thoroughbred racehorse owner and breeder who married Henry Carnegie Phipps and Beatrice Forbes, Countess of Granard, who married Bernard Forbes, 8th Earl of Granard, as well as Ogden Livingston Mills, the 50th Secretary of the Treasury.

He attended the Browning School in New York, the University of Bonn in Germany, and graduated from Yale University with a bachelor's degree in 1904 and a law degree in 1907.

Reid was an early member of the Yale swim team, perhaps "Yale's first great swimmer." For a time after graduation, he supported the team financially and even helped coach the team.

== Career ==
Following his graduation from Yale Law School, he spent a year abroad as secretary to his father when he was the U.S. Ambassador to Great Britain. Upon his return to the U.S., he worked at the New York Tribune beginning in 1908 as a reporter. The paper was founded in 1841 by Horace Greeley. He was an employee there, working in all of the various departments as assistant to the city editor and assistant night editor, until 1912, when, on his father's death he was named editor. Reid was a zealous defender of the freedom of the press, and was quoted in 1931 at a commencement address at Miami University at Oxford, Ohio, as saying:

There is a much more serious side to the problem of newspapers striving honestly to print all the news. It is the occasional forces to muzzle sources of information. This strikes at the freedom of the press without which our country would fall to a par with Soviet Russia, where subsidized and rigorously controlled governmental organs publish only the favorable side of the picture. Every move in our country on the part of the Government in this direction has failed, and, I believe, will always fail. If ever it does not, then we have real cause for worry. If newspaper independence dies, honest and efficient government dies with it.

In 1924, he purchased the New York Herald for $5,000,000 ($74,382,930 in 2025), combining them to create New York Herald Tribune. In 1932, the combined paper became profitable, and remained profitable until Reid's death in 1947.

From 1930 to 1932, Reid served as Commodore of the St. Regis Yacht Club on the Upper St. Regis Lake.

== Personal life ==
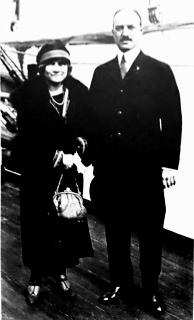
Helen and Ogden Reid, 1920

In 1911, Reid married Helen Miles Rogers at the Racine College Chapel in Racine, Wisconsin. She was the daughter of Benjamin Talbot Rogers, a prominent Wisconsin merchant, and his wife Sarah Louise Johnson. Helen graduated from Barnard College in 1903 and was social secretary for Reid's mother. Together, they were the parents of:

- Whitelaw Reid (1913–2009), who also served as president and chairman of the Herald Tribune.
- Elisabeth Reid (1915–1924), who died in childhood.
- Ogden Rogers Reid (1925-2019), who served as the U.S. Ambassador to Israel and was a four-term U.S. Representative from New York.

Upon his mother's death in 1931, Reid inherited Camp Wild Air and a three-million-dollar trust fund.

Reid died in the Harkness Pavilion at Columbia Presbyterian Hospital in New York City. His funeral was held at St. Thomas Church in New York and he was buried at Sleepy Hollow Cemetery in Tarrytown, New York. Following his death, his widow took over as president of the New-York Tribune. His estate was valued at $9,478,112 ($107,141,708 in 2025), of which $5,780,702 ($65,345,744 in 2025) was given to the Reid Foundation, a non-taxable charitable foundation.

=== Honors and awards ===
Reid was honored by the French government with the rank of Officer in the Legion of Honour, and by the Belgian government with the honor of Commander of the Order of Leopold II of Belgium. In 1931, when King Prajadhipok of Siam came to the United States for an operation, he stayed at Ophir Hall, Reid's Renaissance Revival residence in Purchase, New York, designed by Stanford White, with landscaping by Frederick Law Olmsted, and built in 1892 as a dwelling for his father.
