= Camp Wild Air =

- U.S. National Register of Historic Places
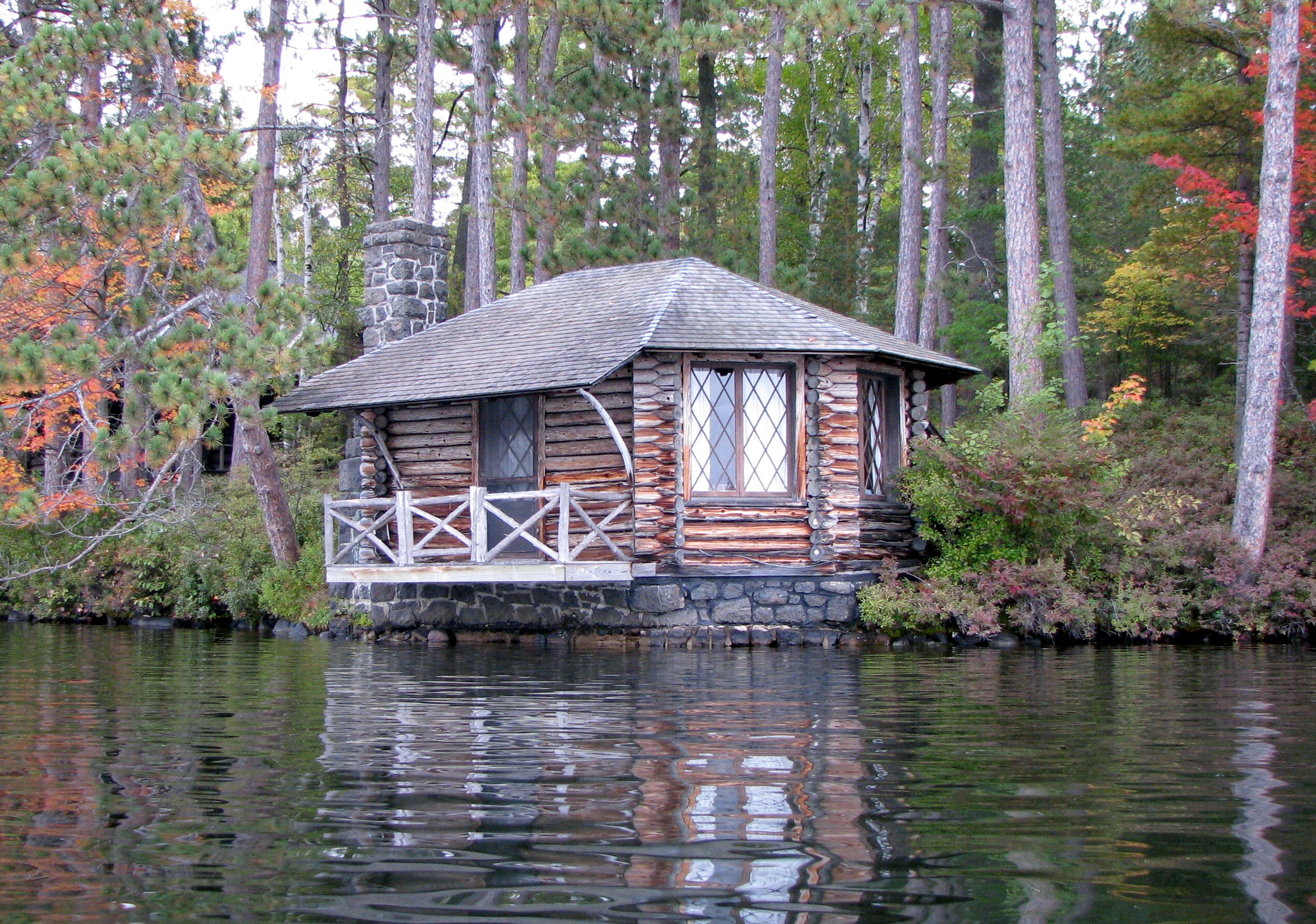
- The "Bishops Palace"

- Location within New York Location within the United States
- Location: Upper Saint Regis Lake, New York; 44°24′31″N 74°16′30″W
- Built: 1882
- Architect: William Rutherford Mead
- MPS: Great Camps of the Adirondacks TR
- NRHP reference No.: 86002930
- Added to NRHP: November 7, 1986

Begun in 1882, Camp Wild Air was the first permanent camp on Upper Saint Regis Lake, in the town of Brighton, Franklin County in New York's Adirondacks. The camp was built by New York Herald Tribune publisher Whitelaw Reid on a 29-acre (12 ha) peninsula accessible only by water. It presently consists of 12 buildings, 10 of which were built before 1931.

The camp was originally designed by Reid's niece, Ella Spencer Reid, who also named the camp. It was begun on land that was leased; Mildred Phelps Stokes Hooker (1881–1970), daughter of Anson Phelps Stokes, in her Camp Chronicles, sniffs that "she seems to have built before she owned." The land was purchased by the Reids in 1890. The main lodge of unpeeled cedar logs, called the Living Room, was designed by McKim, Mead and White, and is the only known example of a rustic design from that firm. It was added in 1917 after a fire damaged earlier structures; it features sitting and billiard rooms overlooking the lake. The "Bishop's Palace", a small log octagon set at the water's edge with a massive fireplace and chimney, was named for its occasional use by Episcopalian clerics; there are two other, similar buildings at the camp, all designed by William Rutherford Mead. There is also a guest cottage with eight bedrooms, two boathouses and a recreation hall. The main buildings are connected by stone walkways. Many of the furnishings are original.

The camp is still owned by descendants of the original owners. It was included in a multiple property submission for listing on the National Register of Historic Places and was listed in 1986.

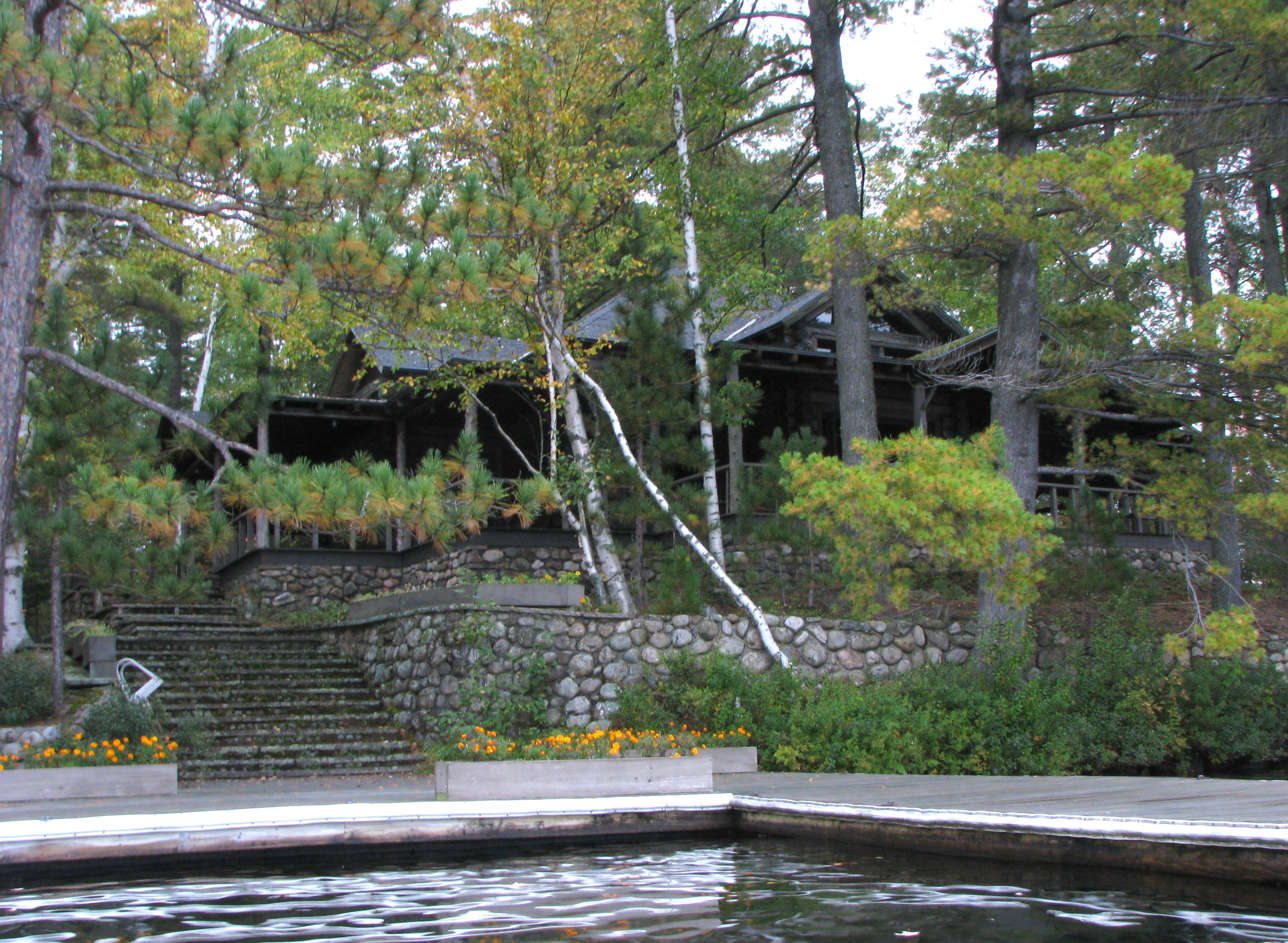
The "Living Room"

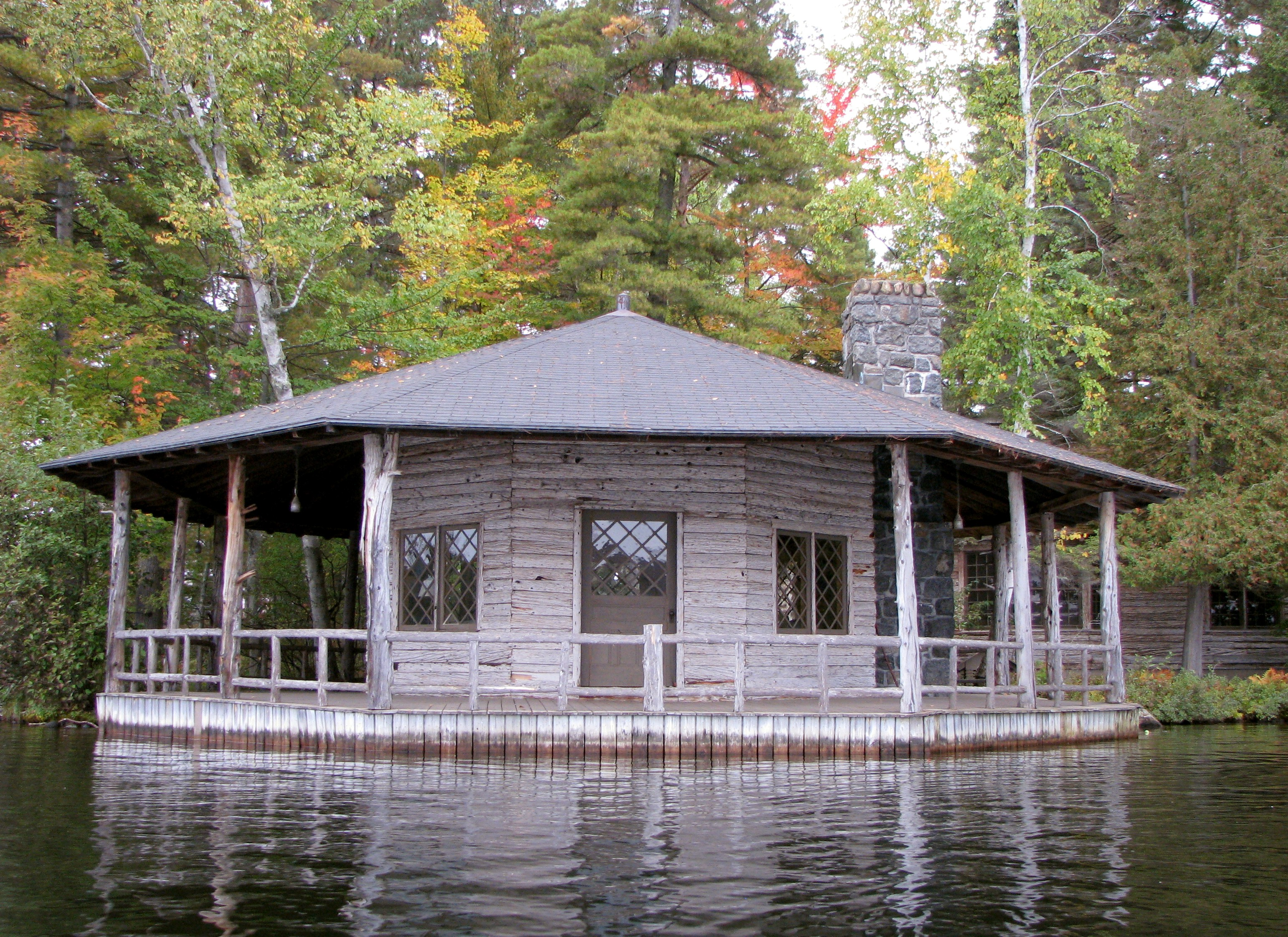
Billiard Room

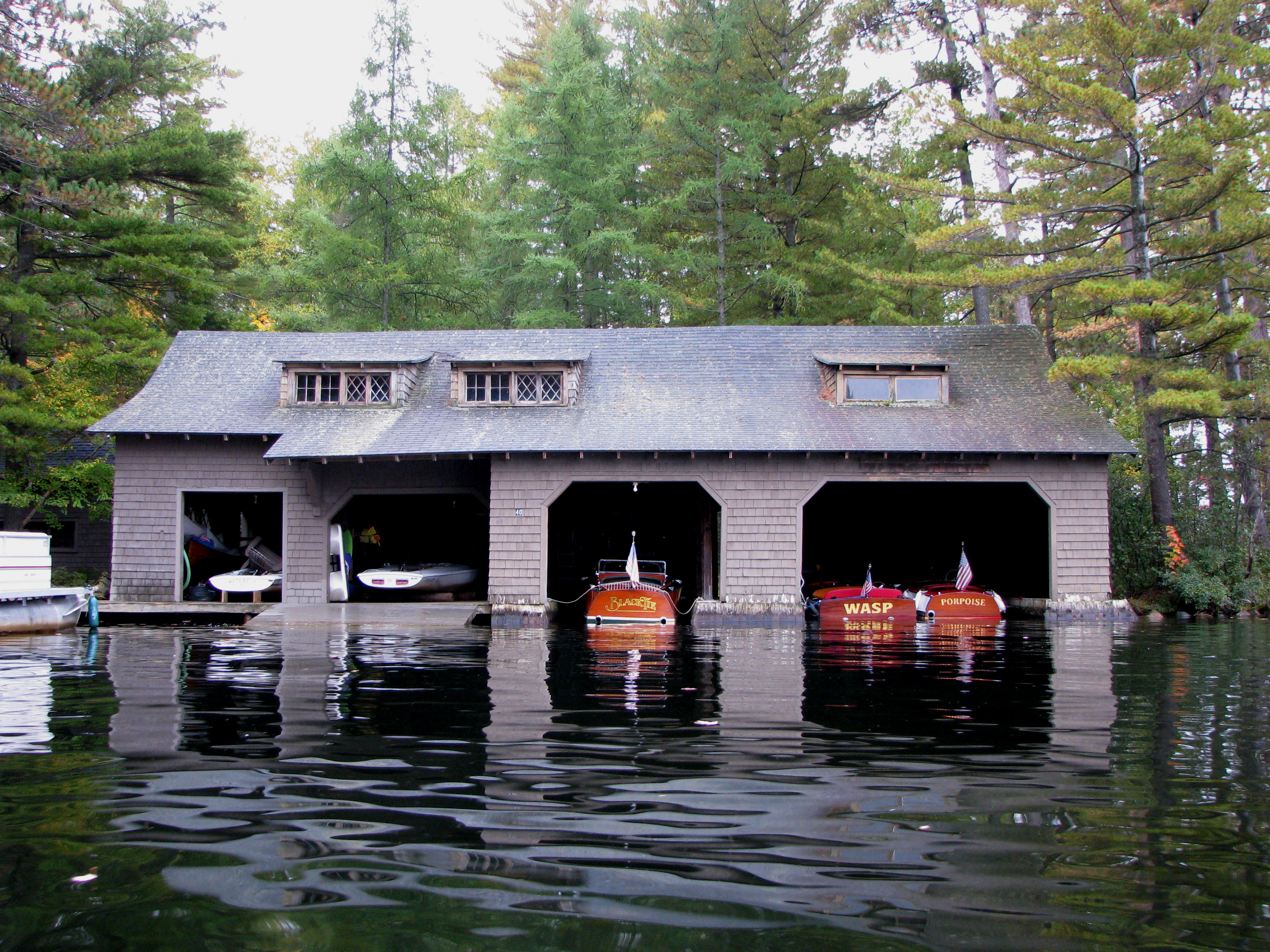
The Boathouse

== Sources ==
- Gilborn, Craig. Adirondack Camps: Homes Away from Home, 1850-1950. Blue Mountain Lake, NY: Adirondack Museum; Syracuse: Syracuse University Press, 2000.
- Kaiser, Harvey. Great Camps of the Adirondacks. Boston: David R. Godine, 1982.
- Hooker, Mildred Phelps Stokes, Camp Chronicles, Blue Mountain Lake, NY: Adirondack Museum, 1964. ISBN 0-910020-16-7.
