= Helen Rogers Reid =

American newspaper publisher

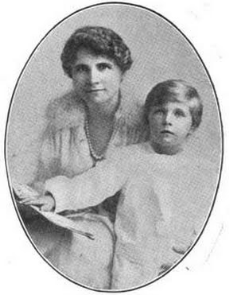
- Helen Rogers Reid, 1921
- Born: Helen Miles Rogers; November 23, 1882; Appleton, Wisconsin, U.S.
- Died: July 27, 1970 (aged 88); New York City, U.S.
- Education: Barnard College
- Occupation: President of the New York Herald Tribune
- Spouse: Ogden Mills Reid (m. 1911; died 1947)
- Children: 3, including Whitelaw, Ogden
- Parent(s): Benjamin Talbot Rogers; Sarah Louise Johnson
- Relatives: Whitelaw Reid (father-in-law)

Helen Miles Rogers Reid (November 23, 1882 – July 27, 1970) was an American newspaper publisher. She was president of the New York Herald Tribune.

== Early life ==
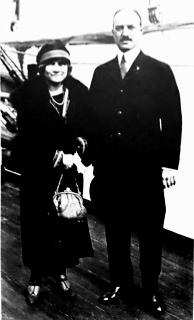
Helen and Ogden Reid, 1920

Reid was born Helen Miles Rogers in Appleton, Wisconsin on November 23, 1882. She was the daughter of Benjamin Talbot Rogers, a prominent merchant, and his wife Sarah Louise (née Johnson) Rogers. She was the youngest of eleven children including: Minna Rogers Winslow, James Carson Rogers, Grace Eleanor Rogers, the Rev. Benjamin Talbot Rogers Jr., Annette Rogers, and Florence Rogers Ferguson.

== Career ==
She graduated with an A.B. from Barnard College in 1903. She became social secretary for Elisabeth Mills Reid, the wife of Whitelaw Reid (1837–1912), the U.S. ambassador to Great Britain and France and 1892 Republican vice presidential candidate. She worked for Mrs. Reid for eight years, spending time in the United Kingdom and the United States. She then married Mrs. Reid's son Ogden Mills Reid.

In 1918, six years after her father-in-law died, her husband brought her in and she began working at the New-York Tribune, becoming an advertising solicitor. Instrumental in merging the New-York Tribune with the New York Herald, she took over as president on the death of her husband in 1947. In her obituary, The New York Times described her as follows:

Mrs. Reid was an unflamboyant but powerful force in the newspaper world and in the city's civic and social life. Her business acumen, first displayed as an advertising salesman, and her editorial judgment, in making the paper attractive to women and suburban readers, helped to transform The Herald Tribune into a modern newspaper.

She was elected a Fellow of the American Academy of Arts and Sciences in 1950. An active supporter of her alma mater, she served for nine years as chairman of the board of trustees, and in 1963, she helped raise funds for a dormitory at Barnard, which was then named for her. She was a trustee of the Metropolitan Museum of Art, active in the New York Newspaper Women's Club, and was president of the Reid Foundation, an organization funded and established by her husband to give journalists fellowships to study and travel abroad.

== Personal life ==
In 1911, Reid married Ogden Mills Reid (1882–1947) the son of her employer Elizabeth Mills Reid at the Racine College Chapel in Racine, Wisconsin.

- Whitelaw Reid (1913–2009), who also served as president and chairman of the Herald Tribune.
- Elisabeth Reid (1915–1924), who died in childhood.
- Ogden Rogers Reid (1925-2019), who served as the U.S. Ambassador to Israel and was a four-term U.S. Representative from New York.

Reid died in New York on July 27, 1970. Her funeral, presided over by The Right Rev. Paul Moore Jr., the Bishop of New York, was attended by over 300 people and held at St. Thomas Church, followed by burial next to her husband at Sleepy Hollow Cemetery in Tarrytown, New York. Besides family, the funeral was attended by John Hay Whitney, who purchased The Herald Tribune, August Heckscher, the Parks Commissioner who was chief editorial writer, Mayor John Lindsay, David Rockefeller, Robert Moses, former head of the Triborough Bridge and Tunnel Authority, Andrew Cordier, the president of Columbia University, and Kingman Brewster Jr., the president of Yale University.
