= Whitelaw Reid (journalist) =

American journalist (1913–2009)

- Born: July 26, 1913; Purchase, New York, U.S.
- Died: April 18, 2009 (aged 95); White Plains, New York, U.S.
- Education: St. Paul's School; Yale University
- Occupation: Journalist
- Spouses: Joan Brandon (m. 1948; div. 1959) Elizabeth Ann Brooks (m. 1959)
- Children: 4
- Parent(s): Helen Rogers Reid; Ogden Mills Reid
- Relatives: Ogden R. Reid (brother); Whitelaw Reid (grandfather); Elisabeth Mills Reid (grandmother)

Whitelaw Reid (July 26, 1913 – April 18, 2009) was an American journalist who later served as editor, president and chairman of the family-owned New York Herald Tribune. An avid sportsman throughout his life, he won a national singles title in his age group at the age of 85 and a national doubles title at the age of 90, both in tennis.

== Early life ==
Reid was born to Helen Rogers Reid and Ogden Mills Reid at the family estate, Ophir Hall, in Purchase, New York, on July 26, 1913. He was given the name of his grandfather Whitelaw Reid, who published the newspaper and also served as United States Ambassador to both France and the United Kingdom, as well as being the unsuccessful Republican vice presidential nominee with incumbent President Benjamin Harrison in 1892. His brother, Ogden R. Reid (b. 1925), was a former U.S. ambassador to Israel and a four-term United States representative from New York.

His early education was at the Lincoln School, New York City, New York, and at the St. Paul's School, Concord, New Hampshire. He later attended Yale University, New Haven, Connecticut, where he was awarded a degree in sociology in 1936. While in college, he sailed a schooner across the Atlantic Ocean from Norway to the U.S. with a group of his fellow students and was a member of the Conservative Party of the Yale Political Union.

== Career ==
He joined his father's newspaper, the New York Herald Tribune, in 1938, working in the mechanical department, after being trained in printing at the Rochester Institute of Technology, Henrietta, New York, and learning the operation of the firm's Mergenthaler Linotype machines. By 1940, he was a reporter, and spent time in the United Kingdom reporting on World War II during The Blitz and filing reports based on flying with the U.K. Royal Air Force in missions over Europe and on a trawler in the English Channel monitoring for Nazi actions.

He served in the U.S. Navy, commissioned in 1941 as a pilot, spending most of the war transporting Navy planes in the U.S. He was sent to the Pacific Theater in 1945, where his squadron based on Iwo Jima, Japan, performed survey missions off the coast of Japan.

After completing his military service in 1946, Reid returned to the paper as assistant to the editor, and was named editor and vice president after his father's death the following year. He was named editor and president in 1953, and assumed the title of chairman in April 1955, succeeding his mother, at the same time his brother Ogden R. Reid was named as publisher. Reid's leadership of the paper saw circulation increase, while journalistic standards declined. A paper that The New York Times described as "a newspaperman's newspaper," staffed by talented reporters, resorted to puzzles and gimmicks to draw readers.

=== Sale of The New York Herald Tribune ===
In 1958, Ambassador and investor John Hay Whitney bought the parent company from the Reid family. Whitney instituted a redesign and hired new reporters, but his efforts failed to revive the paper, which succumbed to the effects of strikes and other difficulties when what had become the New York World Journal Tribune ceased publication in 1967. The suspension of publication by the World Journal Tribune on May 5, 1967, left New York City with three major daily newspapers — the Daily News, the New York Post and The New York Times — the same papers that have served the city for the succeeding decades.

While with the Herald Tribune, Reid was the president of The Fresh Air Fund, a fundraising effort run through the paper that helped provide summer vacations for underprivileged children living in New York City. After the paper's demise, the program was carried on by The New York Times. Following the closure of the paper, he established Reid Enterprises, serving until 1975 as its president.

== Personal life ==
In 1948, Reid married Joan Brandon, a student at Barnard College. She was the daughter of Carter Brandon and Dorothy Brandon, a member of the editorial staff at the Herald Tribune. The marriage eventually ended with their divorce in Reno, Nevada, in September 1959, after they had two children together:

- Brandon Reid (b. 1950), who married Betsy Lipman in 1971. They divorced and he later married Diane M. McCabe in 1983.
- Carson Reid (Kit) (b. 1952), who married Jeanne Marie Haverbeck in 1982. He later married Tamar Clarke, which ended in divorce. In 2019 Carson married Renee' Toussaint.

After their divorce, Joan married Dr. Bruce B. Grynbaum, a physician and educator. In 1959, Whitey was married to his second wife, the former Elizabeth Ann Brooks. She was the daughter of Dr. and Mrs. John Graham Brooks. Together, Elizabeth and Whitelaw had two children, a son and a daughter:

- John Graham Reid, who married Tracy Hightower in 1996.
- Gina Rogers Reid, who married Christopher Wardenburg Maxmin in 1991.

An avid tennis player for most of his life, Reid won the national indoor singles championship in 1998 for competitors age 85 and older, earning the fourth spot in nationwide rankings in his age group. In September 2003, together with David Carey, he won the United States Tennis Association's national clay-court doubles championship for men over age 90. Reid was a pilot, yachtsman, skier, swimmer and rode horses, in addition to his lifelong passion for playing tennis. Ophir Hall, the site of Manhattanville College admissions building, is part of the families former estate in Purchase, New York.

A resident of Bedford Hills, New York, Reid died at age 95 on April 18, 2009, at the White Plains Hospital Center, White Plains, New York, from complications resulting from lung and heart failure.

=== Descendants ===
Through his eldest son Brandon, he was the grandfather of five from Brandon's two marriages (first to Betsy Lipman Lewis and then to Diane Reid), including Whitelaw Reid, Kate Carson Reid Laing and Molly Reid Bevan, and then Jillian Reid and Brittany Reid. Through his son Carson (Kit), he was the grandfather of three, including Helen Reid, Brandon Reid, and Charlie Reid. Through his son John, he was the grandfather of Kelby B. Reid and Caitlyn C. Reid and through his daughter Gina, he was the grandfather of C. Reid Maxmin.
