= Whitelaw Reid House =

Historic house in Ohio, United States

- U.S. National Register of Historic Places
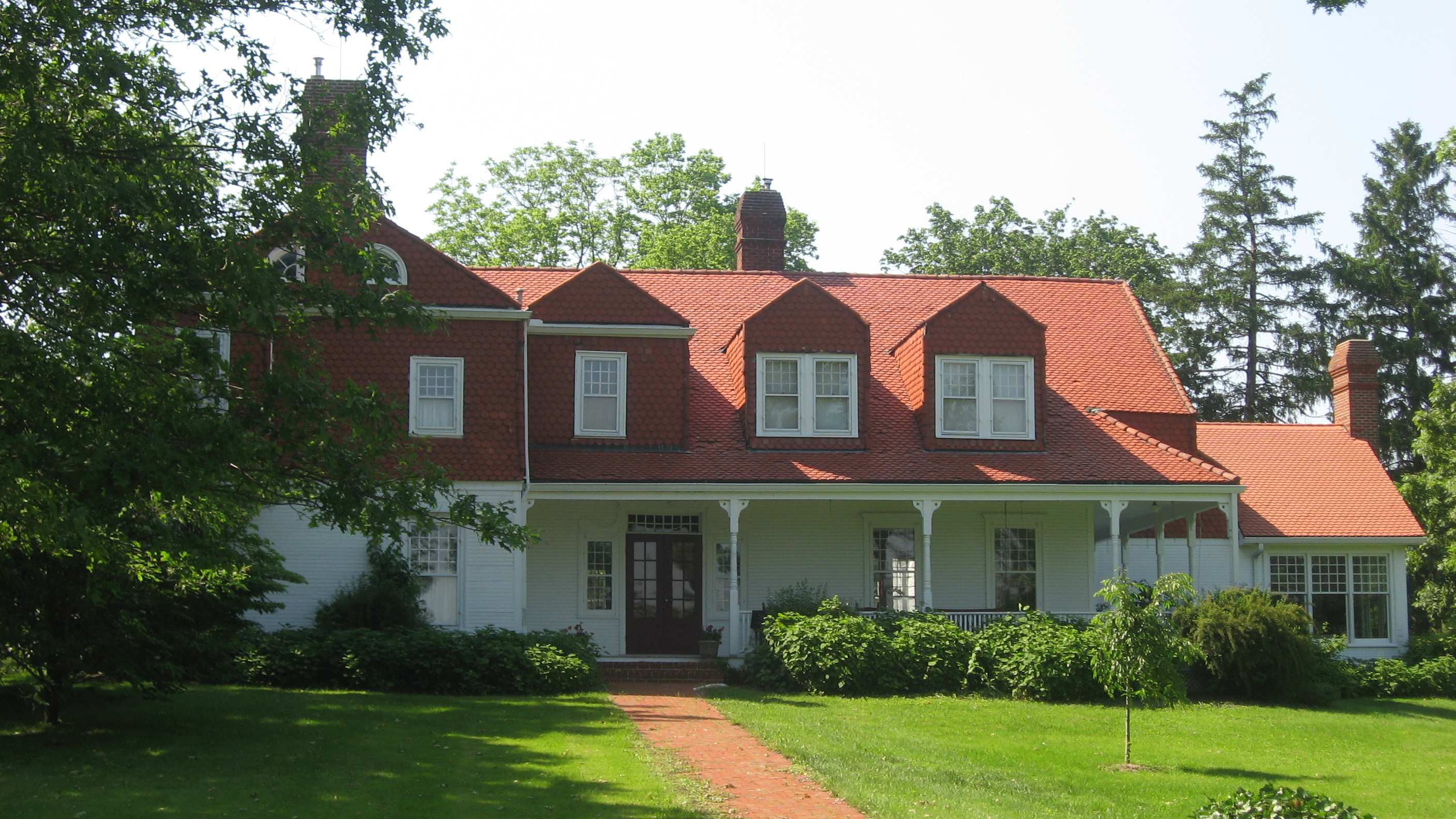
- Front of the house

- Location within Ohio Location within the United States
- Location: 2587 Conley Rd.
- Nearest city: Cedarville, Ohio
- Coordinates: 39°45′6″N 83°50′10″W
- Area: 6 acres (2.4 ha)
- Built: 1823
- Architect: Whitelaw Reid
- Architectural style: Queen Anne
- NRHP reference No.: 73001448
- Added to NRHP: May 7, 1973

The Whitelaw Reid House is a historic residence near the village of Cedarville in Greene County, Ohio, United States. Built in the early nineteenth century, it was home to a prominent American journalist, and it has been named a historic site.

The Reid House is a weatherboarded structure with a tiled roof. The present form of the house makes it an example of the Queen Anne style, although it has been substantially remodeled since its original construction in 1823. More ornate than the exterior is the interior of the house: the main stairway and some of the rooms feature decorative panelling and numerous other handcrafted wooden elements, and various types of wood can be found throughout the house. Due to their location on a small country road, southwest of Cedarville, the house and surrounding farm appear to be little changed from their appearance in the nineteenth century.

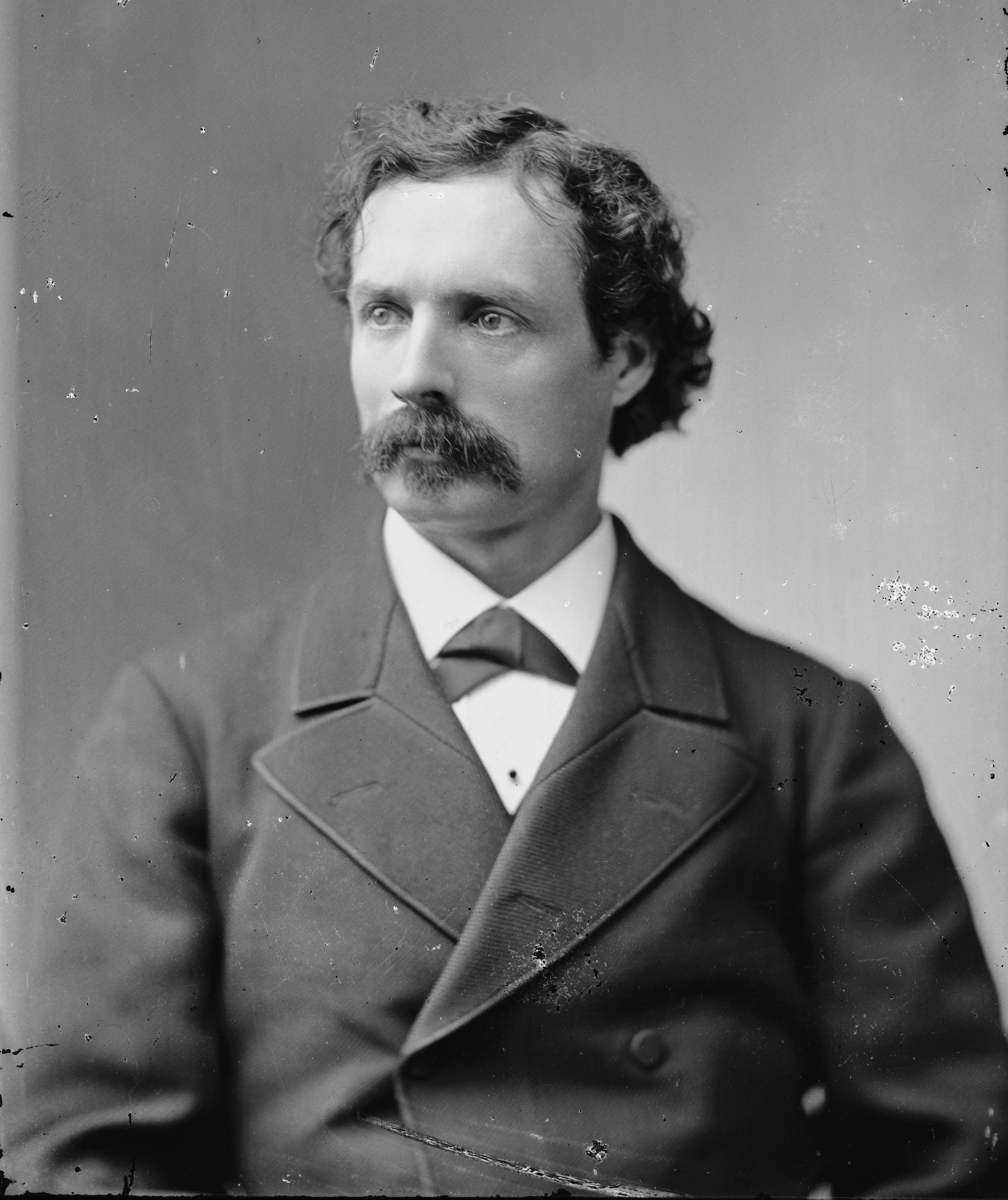
Reid pictured in the 1870s

The house was the birthplace and longtime home of Whitelaw Reid, a nationally known journalist, United States Ambassador to the United Kingdom, and Republican candidate for Vice President of the United States under Benjamin Harrison in the 1892 presidential election. During his years of living in the house, Reid greatly modified the house, and as a result it has been deemed a fine example of changing tastes in architectural styles.

In 1973, the Reid House was listed on the National Register of Historic Places. While it qualified for the Register simply because of its architecture, its importance was largely derived from its close association with Whitelaw Reid.

Since 1974, the Reid House is the home of Mike DeWine, who is currently the Ohio Governor, as well as a former Ohio Attorney General and former US Senator.
