= Ogden Reid =

American politician (1925–2019)

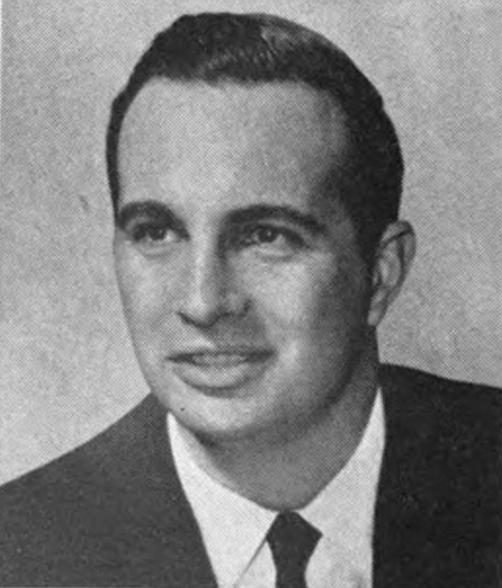

Member of the U.S. House of Representatives from New York
- In office January 3, 1963 – January 3, 1975
- Preceded by: Edwin B. Dooley
- Succeeded by: Richard Ottinger
- Constituency: 26th district (1963–1973); 24th district (1973–1975)

United States Ambassador to Israel
- In office July 2, 1959 – January 19, 1961
- President: Dwight D. Eisenhower
- Preceded by: Edward B. Lawson
- Succeeded by: Walworth Barbour

Personal details
- Born: Ogden Rogers Reid; June 24, 1925 New York City, U.S.
- Died: March 2, 2019 (aged 93) Waccabuc, New York, U.S.
- Party: Democratic (after 1972)
- Other political affiliations: Republican (before 1972)
- Spouse: Mary Louise Stewart (m. 1949)
- Parent(s): Helen Rogers Reid; Ogden Mills Reid
- Relatives: Whitie Reid (brother); Whitelaw Reid (grandfather)
- Education: The Buckley School · Deerfield Academy
- Alma mater: Yale University

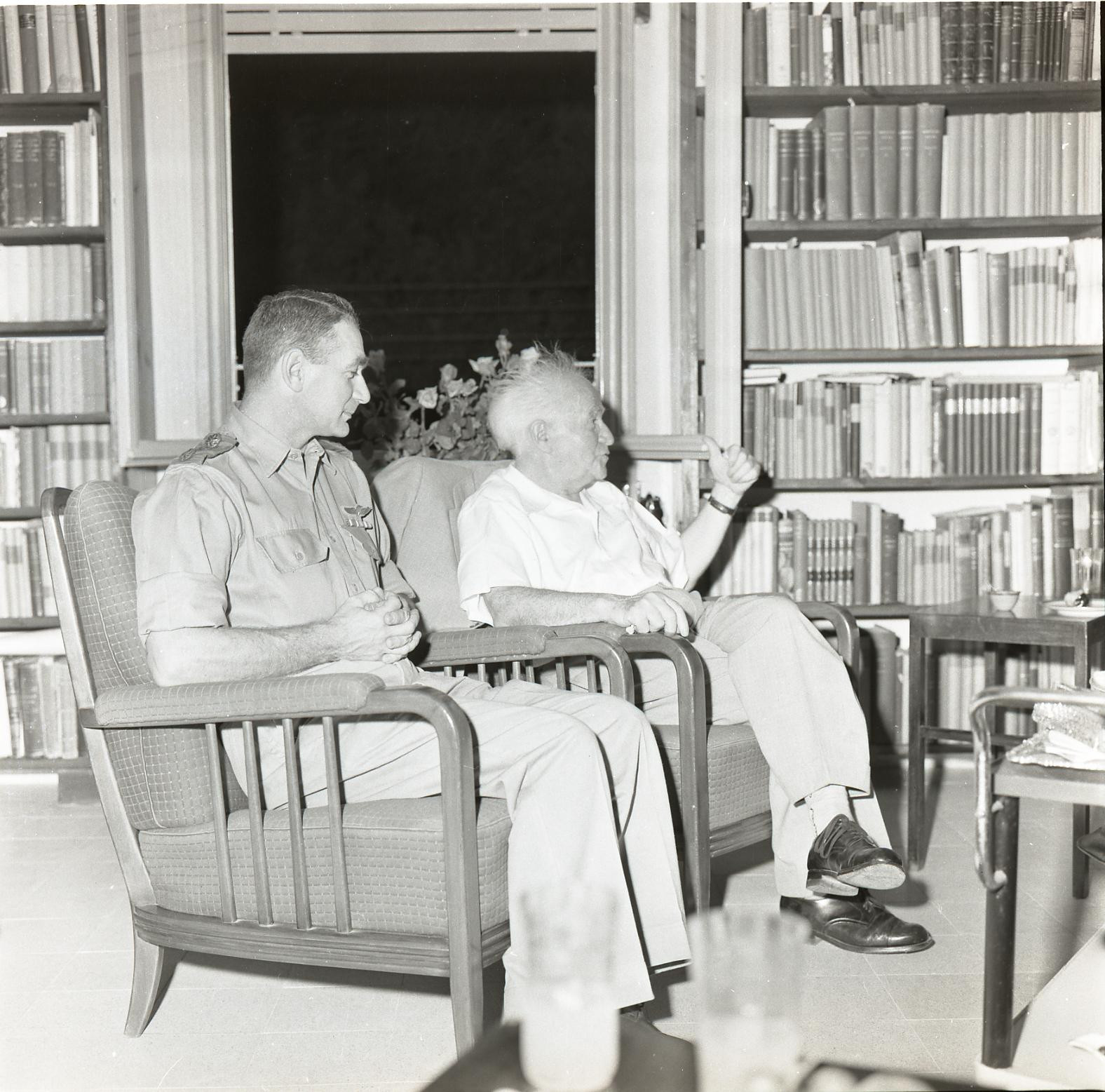
Reid sitting alongside Israeli prime minister David Ben Gurion. 1960, Boris Carmi, Meitar collection, National Library of Israel

Ogden Rogers Reid (June 24, 1925 – March 2, 2019) was an American politician and diplomat. He was the U.S. ambassador to Israel and a six-term United States representative from Westchester County, New York, serving from 1963 to 1975.

== Early life ==
Reid was born in New York City, the son of publishers Helen Rogers Reid (1882–1970) and Ogden Mills Reid (1882–1947), and the brother of Whitey Reid (1913–2009) and of Elisabeth Reid, who died in childhood.

He was the grandson of diplomat and 1892 Republican vice presidential candidate Whitelaw Reid (1837–1912). His family owned the New York Herald Tribune and before that the New York Tribune. His aunt, Jean Templeton Reid (1884–1962), was married to Sir John Hubert Ward (1870–1938), the son of William Ward, 1st Earl of Dudley. His grandmother, Elisabeth Reid (née Mills) (1857–1931), and her brother, Ogden Mills (1856–1929), were the children of Darius Ogden Mills (1825–1910).

He graduated from Deerfield Academy in 1943 and Yale University, where he was a member of Book and Snake, in 1949. He was widely known by his nickname, "Brownie".

== Career ==
=== Military service ===
Reid enlisted as a private in the United States Army in 1943 and was discharged as a first lieutenant in 1946. He later served as a captain in the United States Army Reserve.

=== New York Herald Tribune ===
From 1955 until 1958, Reid served as publisher, president, and editor of the family paper, the New York Herald Tribune. During his tenure, he brought puzzle contests and stories from Hollywood into the newspaper, but did little to help the paper's finances. John Hay Whitney bought the paper shortly thereafter in August 1958.

From 1956 until 1959, Reid was a director of the Panama Canal Company.

=== Political career ===
==== Ambassador to Israel ====
From 1959 to 1961, Reid was the United States Ambassador to Israel. In this role, he interacted with Foreign Minister Golda Meir, who expressed Israel's opposition to a proposal to revive the Palestine Conciliation Commission in an attempt to solve the Arab refugee problem. Following his return to the United States, he became a director of the Massachusetts Mutual Life Insurance Company in 1961.

==== United States Congress ====
In 1962, Reid was elected to the Eighty-eighth Congress as a Republican. He was on the liberal fringe of the GOP and faced repeated challenges in primaries.

In 1965, Dr. Martin Luther King Jr. wrote to Rep. Reid thanking him for coming to Alabama and visiting Selma. King wrote that "Your very presence there has had an electric effect upon the voteless and beleaguered Negro citizens of this city, county, state and nation."

One of the most liberal Republicans in the House of Representatives, Reid voted in favor of the Civil Rights Act of 1964, the Voting Rights Act of 1965, the Civil Rights Act of 1968, the Medicare program for the elderly, the Housing and Urban Development Act of 1968, and was one of two Republican co-sponsors of the Kennedy-Griffiths universal healthcare bill in the House of Representatives in 1971, the other being Charles Adams Mosher of Ohio.

On March 22, 1972, he switched parties and joined the Democratic Party. Reid said that he could not support Richard Nixon for re-election and the Republican Party had "moved to the right" and was "not showing the compassion and sensitivity to meet the problems of the average American." After switching parties he turned back a Republican challenge in 1972. In 1974, Reid declined to seek re-election to the House.

While in Congress, Reid sponsored 85 pieces of legislation and co-sponsored 99 pieces of legislation.

=== Later career ===
In 1974, he briefly ran for Governor of New York, dropping out of the race before the election. He later served in the administration of Democratic governor Hugh Carey as Commissioner of Environmental Conservation and was the unsuccessful Democratic nominee for the post of Westchester County Executive in 1983.

His papers are held with the Manuscripts and Archives at the Sterling Memorial Library at Yale University in New Haven, Connecticut.

== Personal life ==
In July 1949, Reid married Mary Louise Stewart (b. July 8, 1925), a Barnard College and Columbia University graduate who was the daughter of William Harold Stewart and Dorothy Miller. She was a granddaughter of Roswell Miller (1843–1913), the former president of the Chicago, Milwaukee & St. Paul Railroad, and Mary Louise Roberts (1866–1955). Her uncle, Roswell Miller Jr. (1894–1983) married Margaret Carnegie (1897–1990), the only daughter of Andrew Carnegie. Together, the Reids had six children:

- Stewart Mills Reid, who married Vivian Green, the daughter of Paul Green, in 1973.
- Michael Whitelaw Reid, who married Anne Katherine Burrows, daughter of Kenneth G. Burrows, in 1984.
- William Rogers Reid, who married Elizabeth Garno, the daughter of Edmund Forsythe Garno Jr., in 2000.
- Elisabeth Reid (b. 1960), who married Richard W. Taylor Jr., son of Richard W. Taylor, in 1981, now divorced and remarried in 2020 to Joseph E. Leo of New Canaan, Connecticut and Hiltonhead, South Carolina
- Ogden Reid (b. 1961)
- David Whitelaw Reid (b. 1967)

During his youth Reid lived at Ophir Cottage, the home in Purchase, New York that was built by his grandfather, Whitelaw Reid. He owned Flyway, a 430‐acre estate in North Carolina near the Virginia border that was worth $600,000 in 1974. Reid was a member of the New York Athletic Club, the River Club and the Wings Club.

== Death ==
Reid died on March 2, 2019, at his home in Waccabuc, New York, at the age of 93.

== See also ==
- List of American politicians who switched parties in office
- List of United States representatives who switched parties

Diplomatic posts
Preceded by Edward B. Lawson	U.S. Ambassador to Israel; July 2, 1959 – January 19, 1961	Succeeded by Walworth Barbour
U.S. House of Representatives
Preceded by Edwin B. Dooley	Member of the U.S. House of Representatives from New York's 26th congressional district 1963–1973	Succeeded by Benjamin Gilman
Preceded by Mario Biaggi	Member of the U.S. House of Representatives from New York's 24th congressional district 1973–1975	Succeeded by Richard Ottinger
