= New York Herald Tribune =

Defunct American newspaper

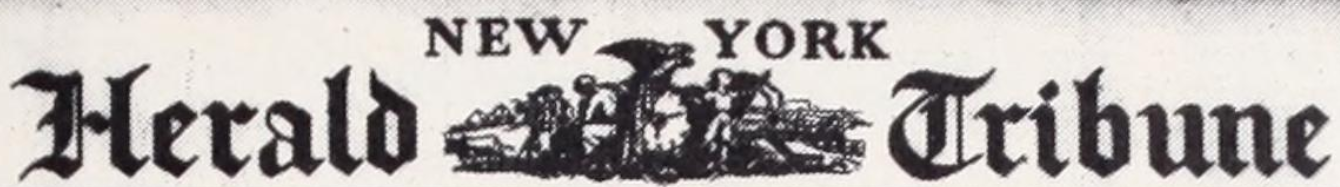

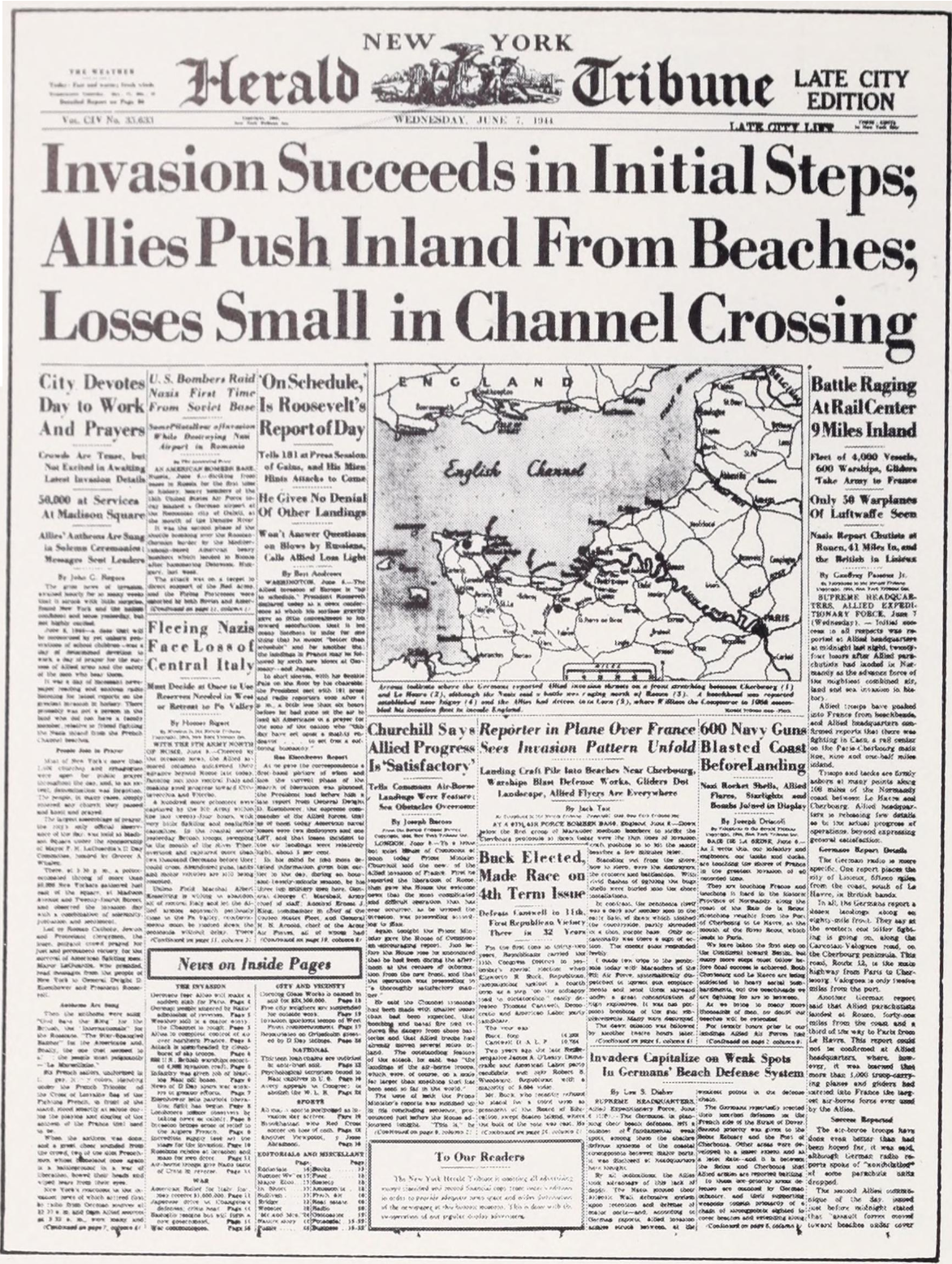
- The front page of the New York Herald Tribune on June 7, 1944, showing the D-Day landings on June 6.
- Owners: Reid Family (1924–1958); John Hay Whitney (1958–1966)
- Founders: Herald: James Gordon Bennett Sr.; Tribune: Horace Greeley
- Publisher: Ogden Mills Reid (1924–1946); Whitelaw Reid (1947–1955); Ogden Rogers Reid (1955–1958); John Hay Whitney (1958–1966)
- Founded: March 19, 1924 (as New York Herald New York Tribune)
- Ceased publication: April 24, 1966 (final edition); August 15, 1966 (paper discontinued during strike)
- Political alignment: Rockefeller Republican
- Language: English
- Headquarters: New York City, New York, U.S.
- Country: United States
- Circulation: 412,000 Daily (1962)
- Sister newspapers: International Herald Tribune
- ISSN: 1941-0646
- OCLC number: 9405828

The New York Herald Tribune was a newspaper published between 1924 and 1966. It was created in 1924 when Ogden Mills Reid of the New York Tribune acquired the New York Herald. It was regarded as a "writer's newspaper" and competed with The New York Times in the daily morning market. The paper won twelve Pulitzer Prizes during its existence. (Note: The winners were: Leland Stowe, Correspondence, 1930; John J. O'Neill, Reporting, 1937; Geoffrey Parsons, Editorial Writing, 1942; Homer Bigart, Telegraphic Reporting – International, 1946; Bert Andrews, National Reporting, 1948; Nathaniel Fein, Photography, 1949; Homer Bigart & Marguerite Higgins, International Reporting, 1951; Sanche De Gramont, Local Reporting – Edition Time, 1961; Walter Lippmann, International Reporting, 1962 (New York Herald Tribune syndicate))

A "Republican paper, a Protestant paper and a paper more representative of the suburbs than the ethnic mix of the city", according to one later reporter, the Tribune generally did not match the comprehensiveness of The New York Times' coverage. Its national, international and business coverage, however, was generally viewed as among the best in the industry, as was its overall style. At one time or another, the paper's writers included Dorothy Thompson, Red Smith, Roger Kahn, Richard Watts Jr., Homer Bigart, Walter Kerr, Walter Lippmann, St. Clair McKelway, Judith Crist, Dick Schaap, Tom Wolfe, John Steinbeck, and Jimmy Breslin. Editorially, the newspaper was the voice for eastern Republicans, later referred to as Rockefeller Republicans, and espoused a pro-business, internationalist viewpoint.

The paper, first owned by the Reid family, struggled financially for most of its existence and rarely generated enough profit for growth or capital improvements; the Reids subsidized the Herald Tribune through the paper's early years. However, it enjoyed prosperity during World War II and by the end of the conflict had pulled close to the Times in ad revenue. A series of disastrous business decisions, combined with aggressive competition from the Times and poor leadership from the Reid family, left the Herald Tribune far behind its rival.

In 1958, the Reids sold the Herald Tribune to John Hay Whitney, a multimillionaire Wall Street investor who was serving as ambassador to the United Kingdom at the time. Under his leadership, the Tribune experimented with new layouts and new approaches to reporting the news and made important contributions to the body of New Journalism that developed in the 1960s. The paper steadily revived under Whitney, but a 114-day newspaper strike stopped the Herald Tribune's gains and ushered in four years of strife with labor unions, particularly the local chapter of the International Typographical Union. Faced with mounting losses, Whitney attempted to merge the Herald Tribune with the New York World-Telegram and the New York Journal-American in the spring of 1966; the proposed merger led to another lengthy strike, and on August 15, 1966, Whitney announced the closure of the Herald Tribune. Combined with investments in the World Journal Tribune, Whitney spent $39.5 million in his attempts to keep the newspaper alive.

After the New York Herald Tribune closed, the Times and The Washington Post, joined by Whitney, entered an agreement to operate the International Herald Tribune, the paper's former Paris publication. By 1967, the paper was owned jointly by Whitney Communications, The Washington Post and The New York Times. The International Herald Tribune, also known as the "IHT", ceased publication in 2013.

== Origins: 1835–1924 ==
=== New York Herald ===
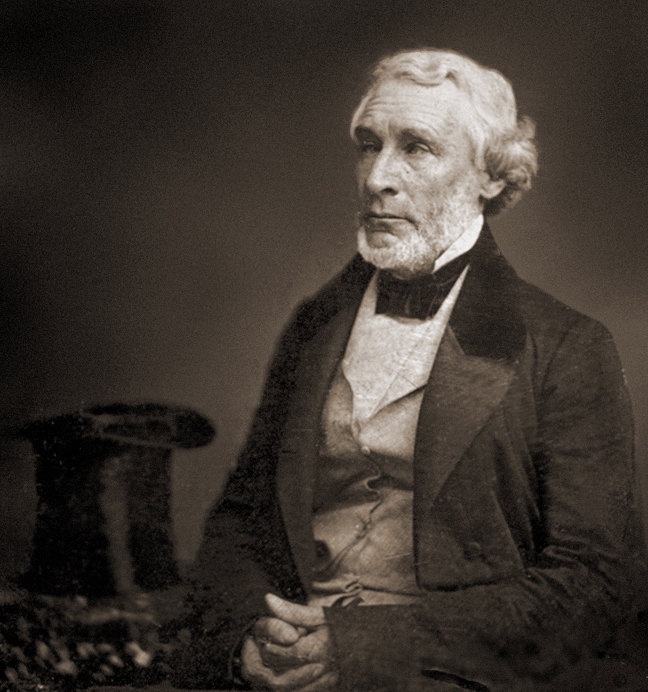
James Gordon Bennett Sr., founder of the New York Herald.

The New York Herald was founded on May 6, 1835, by James Gordon Bennett, a Scottish immigrant who came to the United States aged 24. Bennett, a firm Democrat, had established a name in the newspaper business in the 1820s with dispatches sent from Washington, D.C., to the New York Enquirer, most sharply critical of President John Quincy Adams and Secretary of State Henry Clay; one historian called Bennett "the first real Washington reporter". Bennett was also a pioneer in crime reporting; while writing about a murder trial in 1830, the attorney general of Massachusetts attempted to restrict the coverage of the newspapers: Bennett criticized the move as an "old, worm-eaten, Gothic dogma of the Court...to consider the publicity given to every event by the Press, as destructive to the interests of law and justice". The fight over access eventually overshadowed the trial itself.

Bennett founded the New York Globe in 1832 to promote the re-election of Andrew Jackson to the White House, but the paper quickly folded after the election. After a few years of journalistic piecework, he founded the Herald in 1835 as a penny newspaper, similar in some respects to Benjamin Day's Sun but with a strong emphasis on crime and financial coverage; the Herald "carried the most authentic and thorough list of market prices published anywhere; for these alone it commanded attention in financial circles". Bennett, who wrote much of the newspaper himself, "perfected the fresh, pointed prose practiced in the French press at its best". The publisher's coverage of the 1836 murder of Helen Jewett—which, for the first time in the American press, included excerpts from the murder victim's correspondence—made Bennett "the best known, if most notorious…journalist in the country".

Bennett put his profits back into his newspaper, establishing a Washington bureau and recruiting correspondents in Europe to provide the "first systematic foreign coverage" in an American newspaper. By 1839, the Herald's circulation exceeded that of The London Times. When the Mexican–American War broke out in 1846, the Herald assigned a reporter to the conflict—the only newspaper in New York to do so—and used the telegraph, then a new technology, to not only beat competitors with news but provide Washington policymakers with the first reports from the conflict. During the American Civil War, Bennett kept at least 24 correspondents in the field, opened a Southern desk and had reporters comb the hospitals to develop lists of casualties and deliver messages from the wounded to their families.

=== New-York Tribune ===
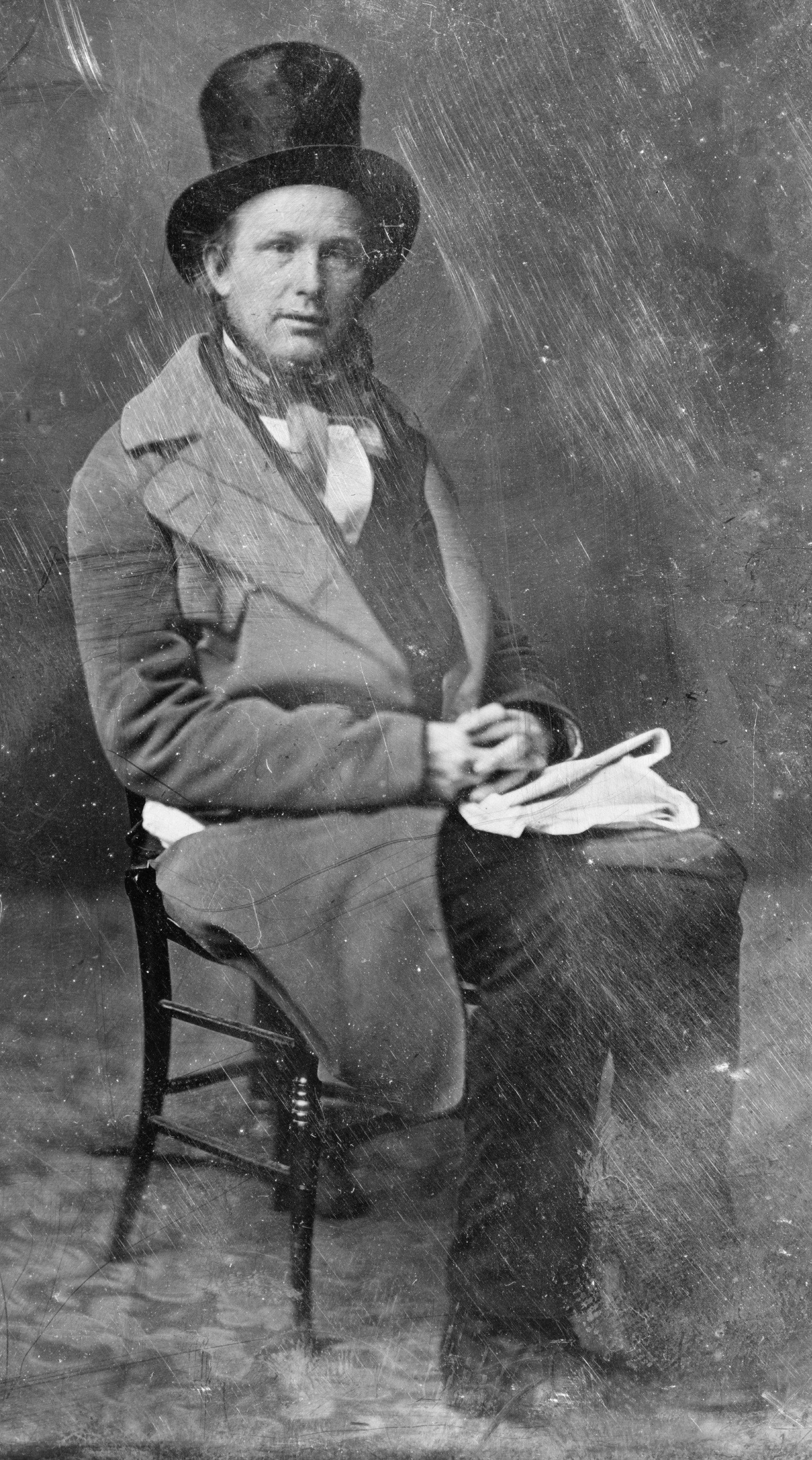
Horace Greeley, editor and publisher of the New-York Tribune

The New-York Tribune was founded by Horace Greeley in 1841. Greeley, a native of New Hampshire, had begun publishing a weekly paper called The New-Yorker (unrelated to the magazine of the same name) in 1834, which won attention for its political reporting and editorials. Joining the Whig Party, Greeley published The Jeffersonian, which helped elect William H. Seward Governor of New York State in 1838, and then the Log Cabin, which advocated for the election of William Henry Harrison in the 1840 presidential election, attained a circulation of 80,000 and turned a small profit.

With Whigs in power, Greeley saw the opportunity to launch a daily penny newspaper for their constituency. The New-York Tribune launched on April 10, 1841. Unlike the Herald or the Sun, it generally shied about from graphic crime coverage; Greeley saw his newspaper as having a moral mission to uplift society, and frequently focused his energies on the newspaper's editorials—"weapons…in a ceaseless war to improve society"—and political coverage. While a lifelong opponent of slavery and, for time, a proponent of socialism, Greeley's attitudes were never exactly fixed: "The result was a potpourri of philosophical inconsistencies and contradictions that undermined Greeley's effectiveness as both logician and polemicist." However, his moralism appealed to rural America; with six months of beginning the Tribune, Greeley combined The New-Yorker and The Log Cabin into a new publication, the Weekly Tribune. The weekly version circulated nationwide, serving as a digest of news melded with agriculture tips. Offering prizes like strawberry plants and gold pens to salesmen, the Weekly Tribune reached a circulation of 50,000 within 10 years, outpacing the Herald's weekly edition.

The Tribune's ranks included Henry Raymond, who later founded The New York Times, and Charles Dana, who would later edit and partly own The Sun for nearly three decades. Dana served as second-in-command to Greeley, but Greeley abruptly fired him in 1862, after years of personality conflicts between the two men. Raymond, who felt he was "overused and underpaid" as a reporter on the Tribune staff, later served in the New York State Assembly and, with the backing of bankers in Albany, founded the Times in 1851, which quickly became a rival for the Whig readership that Greeley cultivated.

After the Civil War, Bennett turned over daily operations of the Herald to his son James Gordon Bennett Jr., and lived in seclusion until his death in 1872. That year, Greeley, who had been an early supporter of the Republican Party, had called for reconciliation of North and South following the war and criticized Radical Reconstruction. Gradually becoming disenchanted with Ulysses S. Grant, Greeley became the surprise nominee of the Liberal Republican faction of the party (and the Democrats) in the 1872 presidential election. The editor had left daily operations of the Tribune to his protege, Whitelaw Reid; he attempted to resume his job after the election, but was badly hurt by a piece (intended humorously) that said Greeley's defeat would chase political office seekers from the Tribune and allow the staff to "manage our own newspaper without being called aside every hour to help lazy people whom we don't know and…benefit people who don't deserve assistance". The piece was widely (and incorrectly) attributed to Greeley as a sign of bitterness at the outcome; Reid refused to print Greeley's furious disclaimer of the story, and by the end of the month, Greeley had died.

=== Decline under second generation ===
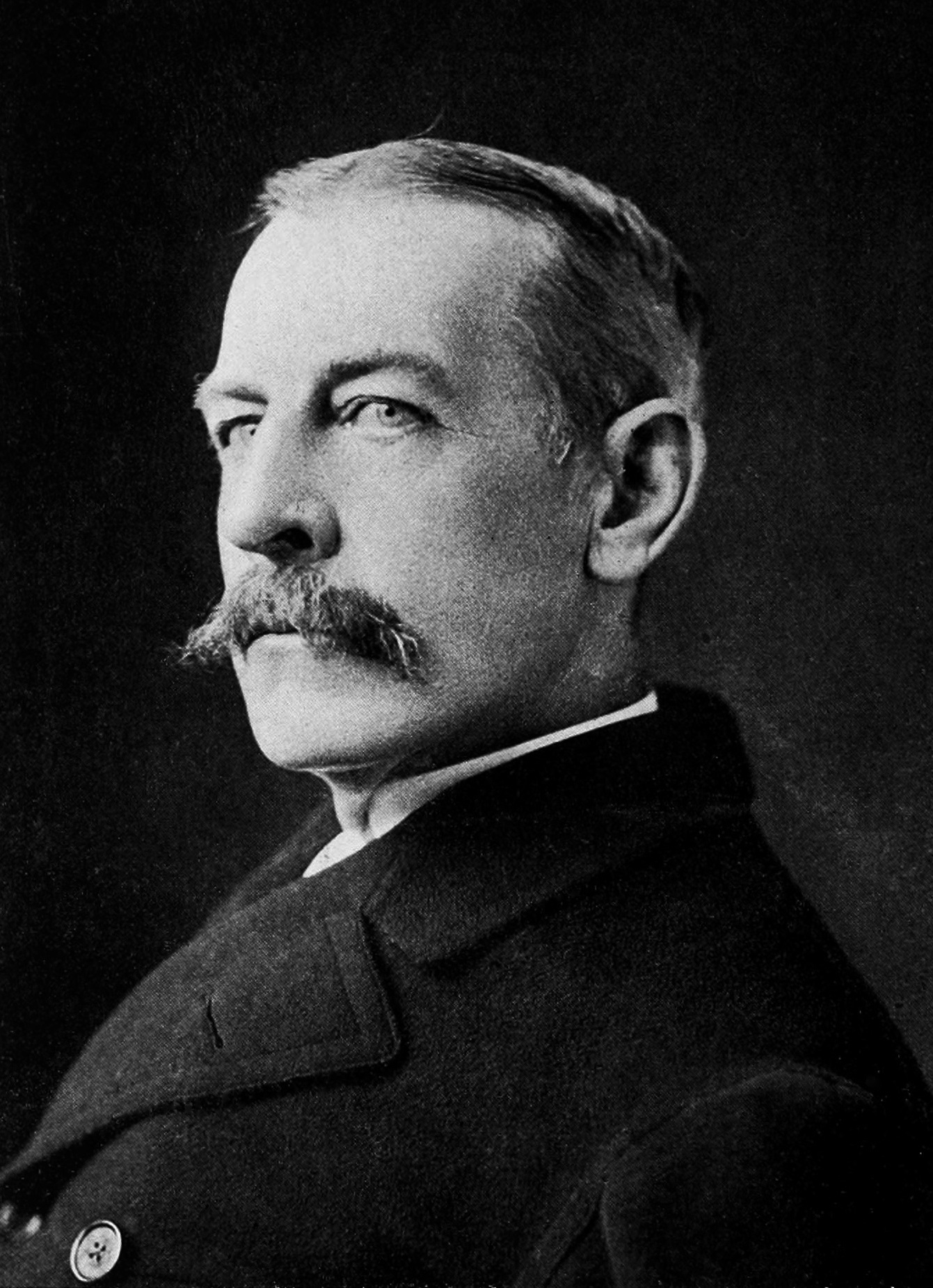
James Gordon Bennett Jr., publisher of the New York Herald from 1866 to 1918.

Both newspapers went into gradual decline under their new proprietors. James Gordon Bennett Jr.—"a swaggering, precociously dissolute lout who rarely stifled an impulse"—had a mercurial reign. He launched the New York Telegram, an evening paper, in the late 1860s and kept the Herald the most comprehensive source of news among the city's newspapers. Bennett also bankrolled Henry Morton Stanley's trek through Africa to find David Livingstone, and scooped the competition on the Battle of Little Big Horn. However, Bennett ruled his paper with a heavy hand, telling his executives at one point that he was the "only reader of this paper": "I am the only one to be pleased. If I want it turned upside down, it must be turned upside down. I want one feature article a day. If I say the feature is black beetles, black beetles it's going to be." In 1874, the Herald ran the infamous New York Zoo hoax, where the front page of the newspaper was devoted entirely to a fabricated story of animals getting loose at the Central Park Zoo.

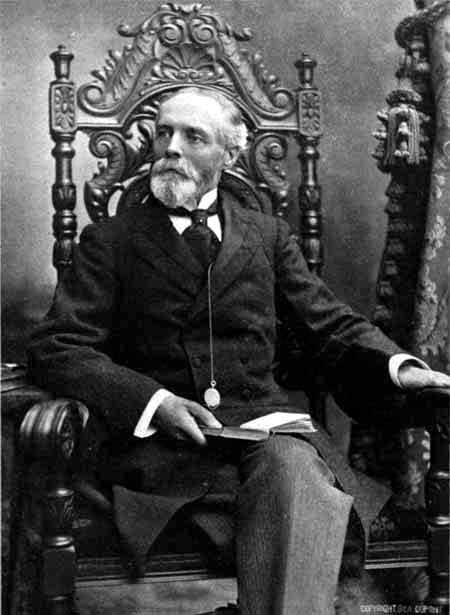
Whitelaw Reid, owner of the New-York Tribune from 1873 to 1912.

Whitelaw Reid, who won control of the Tribune in part due to the likely assistance of financier Jay Gould, turned the newspaper into an orthodox Republican organ, wearing "its stubborn editorial and typographical conservatism…as a badge of honor". Reid's hostility to labor led him to bankroll Ottmar Mergenthaler's development of the linotype machine in 1886, which quickly spread throughout the industry. However, his day-to-day involvement in the operations of the Tribune declined after 1888, when he was appointed Minister to France and largely focused on his political career; Reid even missed a large-scale 50th anniversary party for the Tribune in 1891. Despite this, the paper remained profitable due to an educated and wealthy readership that attracted advertisers.

The Herald was the largest circulation newspaper in New York City until 1884. Joseph Pulitzer, who came from St. Louis and purchased the New York World in 1882, aggressively marketed a mix of crime stories and social reform editorials to a predominantly immigrant audience, and saw his circulation quickly surpass those of more established publishers. Bennett, who had moved permanently to Paris in 1877 after publicly urinating in the fireplace or piano of his fiancée's parents (the exact location differed in witnesses' memories) spent the Herald's still sizable profits on his own lifestyle, and the Herald's circulation stagnated. Bennett respected Pulitzer, and even ran an editorial praising the publisher of The World after health problems forced him to relinquish the editorship of the paper in 1890. However, he despised William Randolph Hearst, who purchased the New York Journal in 1895 and attempted to ape Pulitzer's methods in a more sensationalistic manner. The challenge of The World and the Journal spurred Bennett to revitalize the paper; the Herald competed keenly with both papers during coverage of the Spanish–American War, providing "the soundest, fairest coverage…(of) any American newspaper", sending circulation over 500,000.

The Tribune largely relied on wire copy for its coverage of the conflict. Reid, who helped negotiate the treaty that ended the war had by 1901 become completely disengaged from the Tribune's daily operations. The paper was no longer profitable, and the Reids largely viewed the paper as a "private charity case". By 1908, the Tribune was losing $2,000 a week. In an article about New York City's daily newspapers that year, The Atlantic Monthly found the newspaper's "financial pages … execrable, its news columns readable but utterly commonplace, and its rubber-stamping of Republican policies (making) it the last sheet in town operated as a servant of party machinery".

The Herald also saw its reputation for comprehensiveness challenged by the Times, purchased by Chattanooga Times publisher Adolph Ochs in 1896, a few weeks before the paper would have likely closed its doors. Ochs, turning the once-Republican Times into an independent Democratic newspaper, refocused the newspaper's coverage on commerce, quickly developing a reputation as the "businessman's bible". When the Times began turning a profit in 1899, Ochs began reinvesting the profits make into the newspaper toward news coverage, quickly giving the Times the reputation as the most complete newspaper in the city. Bennett, who viewed the Herald as a means of supporting his lifestyle, did not make serious moves to expand the newspaper's newsgathering operations, and allowed the paper's circulation to fall well below 100,000 by 1912.

=== Revival of the Tribune, fall of the Herald ===
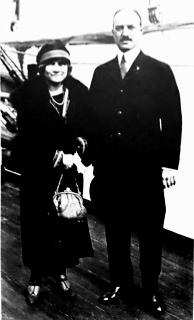
Helen Rogers Reid and Ogden Mills Reid, c. 1920

The Herald suffered a fatal blow in 1907. Bennett, his hatred for the Journal owner unabated, attacked Hearst's campaigns for Congress in 1902, and his run for governor of New York in 1906. The Herald's coverage of Hearst's gubernatorial campaign was particularly vicious, as Bennett ordered his reporters to publish every negative item about Hearst's past that they could. Hearst, seeking revenge, sent a reporter to investigate the Herald's personal columns, which ran in the front of the paper and, in veiled language, advertised the service of prostitutes; reporters referred to it as "The Whores' Daily Guide and Handy Compendium." The resulting investigation, published in the Journal, led to Bennett's conviction on charges of sending obscene matter through the mails. The publisher was ordered to pay a $25,000 fine—Bennett paid it in $1,000 bills—and the Herald "suffered a blow in prestige and circulation from which it never really recovered".

Whitelaw Reid died in 1912 and was succeeded as publisher by his son, Ogden Mills Reid. The younger Reid, an "affable but lackluster person," began working at the Tribune in 1908 as a reporter and won the loyalty of the staff with his good nature and eagerness to learn. Quickly moved through the ranks—he became managing editor in 1912—Reid oversaw the Tribune's thorough coverage of the sinking of the Titanic, ushering a revival of the newspaper's fortunes. While the paper continued to lose money, and was saved from bankruptcy only by the generosity of Elisabeth Mills Reid, Ogden's mother., the younger Reid encouraged light touches at the previously somber Tribune, creating an environment where "the windows were opened and the suffocating solemnity of the place was aired out". Under Reid's tenure the Tribune lobbied for legal protection for journalists culminating in the U.S. Supreme Court case Burdick v. United States. In 1917, the Tribune redesigned its layout and became the first American newspaper to use the Bodoni font for headlines. The font gave a "decided elegance" to the Tribune and was soon adopted by magazines and other newspapers, including The Washington Post, The Boston Globe and the Miami Herald. The Tribune developed a reputation for typographical excellence it would maintain for more than four decades. Reid, who inherited a newspaper whose circulation may have fallen to 25,000 daily—no higher than the circulation in 1872—saw the Tribune's readership jump to about 130,000 by 1924.

Reid's wife, Helen Rogers Reid, took charge of the newspaper's advertising department in 1919. Helen Reid, "who believed in the newspaper the way a religious person believes in God", reorganized the faltering department, aggressively pursuing advertisers and selling them on the "wealth, position and power" of the Tribune's readership. In her first two years on the job, the Tribune's annual advertising revenues jumped from $1.7 million to $4.3 million, "with circulation responsible for no more than 10 percent of the increase". Reid's efforts helped cut the newspaper's dependence on subsidies from the family fortune and pushed it toward a paying track. Reid also encouraged the development of women's features at the newspaper, the hiring of female writers, and helped establish a "home institute" that tested recipes and household products.

The Herald's decline continued in the new decade. With the outbreak of World War I, Bennett devoted most of his attention to the Paris Herald, doing his first newspaper reporting at the age of 73 and keeping the publication alive despite wartime censorship. The New York paper, however, was in freefall, and posted a loss in 1917. The next year, Bennett died, having taken some $30 million out of the lifetime profits of the Herald. Two years later, the Herald newspapers were sold to Frank Munsey for $3 million.

Munsey had won the enmity of many journalists with his buying, selling and consolidation of newspapers, and the Herald became part of Munsey's moves. The publisher merged the morning Sun (which he had purchased in 1916) into the Herald and attempted to revive the newspaper through his financial resources, hoping to establish the Herald as the pre-eminent Republican newspaper within the city. To achieve that end, he approached Elisabeth Mills Reid in early 1924 with a proposal to purchase the Tribune—the only other Republican newspaper in New York—and merge it with the Herald. The elder Reid refused to sell, saying only that she would buy the Herald. The two sides negotiated through the winter and spring. Munsey approached Ogden Reid with a proposal to swap the profitable evening Sun with the Tribune, which Reid refused. The Reids countered with an offer of $5 million for the Herald and the Paris Herald, which Munsey agreed to on March 17, 1924.

The move surprised the journalism community, which had expected Munsey to purchase the Tribune. The Herald management informed its staff of the sale in a brief note posted on a bulletin board; reading it, one reporter remarked "Jonah just swallowed the whale".

The merged paper, which published its first edition on March 19, was named the New York Herald New York Tribune until May 31, 1926, when the more familiar New York Herald Tribune was substituted. Apart from the Herald's radio magazine, weather listings and other features, "the merged paper was, with very few changes, the Tribune intact". Only 25 Herald reporters were hired after the merger; 600 people lost their jobs. Within a year, the new paper's circulation reached 275,000.

== New York Herald Tribune: 1924–1946 ==
=== 1924–1940: Social journalism and mainstream Republicanism ===
Stanley Walker, city editor of the New York Herald Tribune, 1928 to 1935.

The newly merged paper was not immediately profitable, but Helen Reid's reorganization of the business side of the paper, combined with an increasing reputation as a "newspaperman's newspaper", led the Herald Tribune to post a profit of nearly $1.5 million in 1929, as circulation climbed over the 300,000 mark. The onset of the Great Depression, however, wiped out the profits. In 1931, the Herald Tribune lost $650,000 (equivalent to approximately $15,338,415 in 2025 dollars), and the Reid family was once again forced to subsidize the newspaper. By 1933, the Herald Tribune turned a profit of $300,000, and would stay in the black for the next 20 years, without ever making enough money for significant growth or reinvestment.

Through the 1930s Ogden Reid often stayed late at Bleeck's, a popular hangout for Herald Tribune reporters.; by 1945, Tribune historian Richard Kluger wrote, Reid was struggling with alcoholism. The staff considered the Herald Tribune's owner "kindly and likable, if deficient in intelligence and enterprise". Helen Reid increasingly took on the major leadership responsibilities at the newspaper—a fact Time noted in a 1934 cover story. Reid, angered, called her husband "the most independent-minded man I have ever met", to which Time replied that "it is Mrs. Reid who often helps that independent mind make itself up".

Editorially, the newspaper thrived, winning its first Pulitzer Prize for reporting in 1930 for Leland Stowe's coverage of the Second Reparations Conference on German reparations for World War I, where the Young Plan was developed. Stanley Walker, who became the newspaper's city editor in 1928, pushed his staff (which briefly included Joseph Mitchell) to write in a clear, lively style, and pushed the Herald Tribune's local coverage "to a new kind of social journalism that aimed at capturing the temper and feel of the city, its moods and fancies, changes or premonitions of change in its manners, customs, taste, and thought—daily helpings of what amounted to urban anthropology". The Herald Tribune's editorials remained conservative—"a spokesman for and guardian of mainstream Republicanism"—but the newspaper also hired columnist Walter Lippmann, seen at the time as a liberal, after The World closed its doors in 1931. Unlike other pro-Republican papers, such as Hearst's New York Journal-American or the Chicago Tribune-owned New York Daily News, which held an isolationist and pro-German stance, the Herald Tribune was more supportive of the British and the French as the specter of World War II developed, a similar stance was approached by the Sun and the World-Telegram, the latter of them also having an ardently liberal past as a Pulitzer newspaper.

Financially, the paper continued to stay out of the red, but long-term trouble was on the horizon. After Elisabeth Mills Reid died in 1931—after having given the paper $15 million over her lifetime—it was discovered that the elder Reid had treated the subsidies as loans, not capital investments. The notes on the paper were willed to Ogden Reid and his sister, Lady Jean Templeton Reid Ward. The notes amounted to a mortgage on the Herald Tribune, which prevented the newspaper from acquiring bank loans or securing public financing. Financial advisors at the newspaper advised the Reids to convert the notes into equity, which the family resisted. This decision would play a major role in the Reids' sale of the Herald Tribune in 1958.

Seeking to cut costs during the Recession of 1937, the newspaper's management decided to consolidate its foreign coverage under Laurence Hills, who had been appointed editor of the Paris Herald by Frank Munsey in 1920 and kept the paper profitable. But Hills had fascist sympathies—the Paris Herald was alone among American newspapers in having "ad columns sprout(ing) with swastikas and fasces—and was more interested in cutting costs than producing journalism. "It is no longer the desire even to attempt to run parallel with The New York Times in special dispatches from Europe," Hills wrote in a memo to the Herald Tribune's foreign bureaus in late 1937. "Crisp cables of human interest or humorous type cables are greatly appreciated. Big beats in Europe these days are not very likely." The policy effectively led the Herald Tribune to surrender the edge in foreign reporting to its rival.

The Herald Tribune strongly supported Wendell Willkie for the Republican nomination in the 1940 presidential election; Willkie's managers made sure the newspaper's endorsement was placed in each delegate's seat at the 1940 Republican National Convention. The Herald Tribune continued to provide a strong voice for Willkie (who was having an affair with literary editor Irita Van Doren) through the election. Dorothy Thompson, then a columnist at the paper, openly supported Franklin Roosevelt's re-election and was eventually forced to resign.

=== World War II ===
Historians of The New York Times—including Gay Talese, Susan Tifft and Alex S. Jones—have argued that the Times, faced with newsprint rationing during World War II, decided to increase its news coverage at the expense of its advertising, while the Herald Tribune chose to run more ads, trading short-term profit for long-term difficulties. In The Kingdom and the Power, Talese's 1969 book about the Times, Talese wrote "the additional space that The Times was able to devote to war coverage instead of advertising was, in the long run, a very profitable decision: The Times lured many readers away from the Tribune, and these readers stayed with The Times after the war into the Nineteen-fifties and Sixties". Although The New York Times had the most comprehensive coverage of any American newspaper—the newspaper put 55 correspondents in the field, including drama critic Brooks Atkinson—its news budget fell from $3.8 million in 1940 to $3.7 million in 1944; the paper did not significantly expand its number of newsroom employees between 1937 and 1945 and its ad space, far from declining, actually increased during the conflict and was consistently ahead of the Herald Tribune's. Between 1941 and 1945, advertising space in the Times increased from 42.58 percent of the paper to 49.68 percent, while the Tribune saw its ad space increase from 37.58 percent to 49.32 percent. In 1943 and 1944, more than half the Times' went to advertising, a percentage the Herald Tribune did not meet until after the war. However, because the Tribune was generally a smaller paper than the Times and saw its ad space jump more, "the proportionate increase in the Tribune seemed greater than it was in absolute terms. The evidence that this disproportionate increase in the Tribune's advertising content left its readers feeling deprived of war news coverage and sent them in droves to the Times is, at best, highly ambiguous."

The Herald Tribune always had at least a dozen correspondents in the field, the most famous of whom was Homer Bigart. Allowing wire services to write "big picture" stories, Bigart—who covered the Anzio Campaign, the Battle of Iwo Jima and the Battle of Okinawa—focused instead on writing about tactical operations conducted by small units and individual soldiers, in order to "bring a dimension of reality and understanding to readers back home". Frequently risking his life to get the stories, Bigart was highly valued by his peers and the military, and won the 1945 Pulitzer Prize.

By the end of the conflict, the Herald Tribune had enjoyed some of its best financial years in its history. While the newspaper had just 63 percent of its rival's daily circulation (and 70 percent of the Sunday circulation of The Times), its high-income readership gave the paper nearly 85 percent of The New York Times' overall ad revenue, and had made $2 million a year between 1942 and 1945. In 1946, the Herald Tribune's Sunday circulation hit an all-time peak of 708,754.

== Decline: 1947–1958 ==
=== Pressure from the Times ===
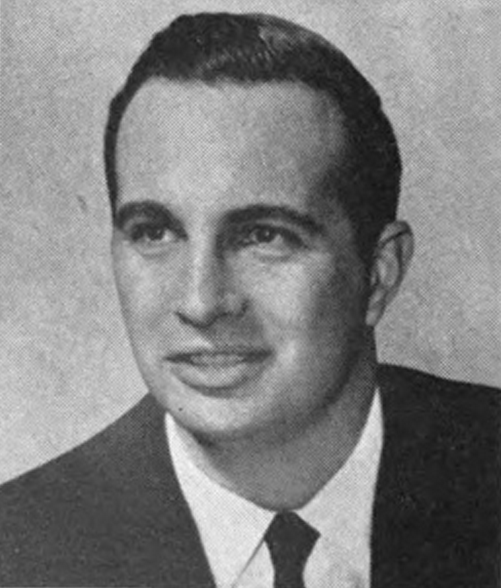
Ogden "Brown" Reid (seen here after his election to Congress) was the last member of his family to lead the New York Herald Tribune.

The Herald Tribune began a decline shortly after World War II that had several causes. The Reid family was long accustomed to resolve shortfalls at the newspaper with subsidies from their fortune, rather than improved business practices, seeing the paper "as a hereditary possession to be sustained as a public duty rather than developed as a profit-making opportunity". With its generally marginal profitability, the Herald Tribune had few opportunities to reinvest in its operations as the Times did, and the Reids' mortgage on the newspaper made it difficult to raise outside cash for needed capital improvements.

After another profitable year in 1946, Bill Robinson, the Herald Tribune's business manager, decided to reinvest the profits to make needed upgrades to the newspaper's pressroom. The investment squeezed the paper's resources, and Robinson decided to make up the difference at the end of the year by raising the Tribune's price from three cents to a nickel, expecting the Times, which also needed to upgrade its facilities, to do the same. However, the Times, concerned by the Tribune's performance during the war, refused to go along. "We didn't want to give them any quarter," Times circulation manager Nathan Goldstein said. "Our numbers were on the rise, and we didn't want to do anything to jeopardize them. 'No free rides for the competition' was the way we looked at it." The move proved disastrous: In 1947, the Tribune's daily circulation fell nine percent, from 348,626 to 319,867. Its Sunday circulation fell four percent, from 708,754 to 680,691. Although the overall percentage of advertising for the paper was higher than it was in 1947, the Times was still higher: 58 percent of the average space in The New York Times in 1947 was devoted to advertising, versus a little over 50 percent of the Tribune. The Times would not raise its price until 1950.

Ogden Reid died early in 1947, making Helen Reid leader of the Tribune in name as well as in fact. Reid chose her son, Whitelaw Reid, known as "Whitie", as editor. The younger Reid had written for the newspaper and done creditable work covering the London Blitz, but had not been trained for the duties of his position and was unable to provide forceful leadership for the newspaper. The Tribune also failed to keep pace with the Times in its facilities: While both papers had about the same level of profits between 1947 and 1950, the Times was heavily reinvesting money in its plant and hiring new employees. The Tribune, meanwhile, with Helen Reid's approval, cut $1 million from its budgets and fired 25 employees on the news side, reducing its foreign and crime coverage. Robinson was dismissive of the circulation lead of the Times, saying in a 1948 memo that 75,000 of its rival's readers were "transients" who only read the wanted ads.

The Times also began to push the Tribune hard in suburbs, where the Tribune had previously enjoyed a commanding lead. At the urging of Goldstein, Times editors added features to appeal to commuters, expanded (and in some cases subsidized) home delivery, and paid retail display allowances—"kickbacks, in common parlance"—to the American News Company, the controller of many commuter newsstands, to achieve prominent display. Tribune executives were not blind to the challenge, but the economy drive at the paper undercut efforts to adequately compete. The newspaper fell into the red in 1951. The Herald Tribune's losses reached $700,000 in 1953, and Robinson resigned late that year.

=== Leadership changes ===
The paper distinguished itself in its coverage of the Korean War; Bigart and Marguerite Higgins, who engaged in a fierce rivalry, shared a Pulitzer Prize with Chicago Daily News correspondent Keyes Beech and three other reporters in 1951. The Tribune's cultural criticism was also prominent: John Crosby's radio and television column was syndicated in 29 newspapers by 1949, and Walter Kerr began a successful three-decade career as a Broadway reviewer at the Tribune in 1951. However, the paper's losses were continuing to mount. Whitelaw Reid was gradually replaced by his brother, Ogden R. Reid, nicknamed "Brown", to take charge of the paper. As president and publisher of the paper, Brown Reid tried to interject an energy his brother lacked and reach out to new audiences. In that spirit, the Tribune ran a promotion called "Tangle Towns", where readers were invited to unscramble the names of jumbled up town and city names in exchange for prizes. Reid also gave more prominent play to crime and entertainment stories. Much of the staff, including Whitelaw Reid, felt there was too much focus on circulation at the expense of the paper's editorial standards, but the promotions initially worked, boosting its weekday circulation to over 400,000.

Reid's ideas, however, "were prosaic in the extreme". His promotions included printing the sports section on green newsprint and a pocket-sized magazine for television listings that initially stopped the Sunday paper's circulation skid, but proved an empty product. The Tribune turned a profit in 1956, but the Times was rapidly outpacing it in news content, circulation, and ad revenue. The promotions largely failed to hold on to the Tribune's new audiences; the Sunday edition began to slide again and the paper fell into the red in 1957. Through the decade, the Tribune was the only newspaper in the city to see its share of ad lineage drop, and longtime veterans of the paper, including Bigart, began departing. The Reids, who had by now turned their mortgage into stock, began seeking buyers to infuse the Tribune with cash, turning to John Hay "Jock" Whitney, whose family had a long association with the Reids. Whitney, recently named ambassador to Great Britain, had chaired Dwight Eisenhower's fundraising campaigns in 1952 and 1956 and was looking for something else to engage him beyond his largely ceremonial role in Great Britain. Whitney, who "did not want the Tribune to die", gave the newspaper $1.2 million over the objections of his investment advisors, who had doubts about the newspaper's viability. The loan came with the option to take controlling interest of the newspaper if he made a second loan of $1.3 million. Brown Reid expected the $1.2 million to cover a deficit that would last through the end of 1958, but by that year the newspaper's loss was projected at $3 million, and Whitney and his advisors decided to exercise their option. The Reids, claiming to have put $20 million into the newspaper since the 1924 merger initially attempted to keep editorial control of the paper, but Whitney made it clear he would not invest additional money in the Tribune if the Reids remained at the helm. The family yielded, and Helen, Whitie and Brown Reid announced Whitney's takeover of the newspaper on August 28, 1958. The Reids retained a substantial stake in the Tribune until its demise, but Whitney and his advisors controlled the paper.

== The Whitney Era: 1958–1966 ==
=== "Who says a good newspaper has to be dull?" ===
Whitney initially left management of the newspaper to Walter Thayer, a longtime advisor. Thayer did not believe the Tribune was a financial investment—"it was a matter of 'let's set it up so that (Whitney) can do it if this is what he wants"—but moved to build a "hen house" of media properties to protect Whitney's investment and provide money for the Tribune. Over the next two years, Whitney's firm acquired Parade, five television stations and four radio stations. The properties, merged into a new company called Whitney Communications Corporation, proved profitable, but executives chafed at subsidizing the Tribune.

Thayer also looked for new leadership for the newspaper. In 1961—the same year Whitney returned to New York—the Tribune hired John Denson, a Newsweek editor and native of Louisiana who was "a critical mass of intensity and irascibility relieved by interludes of amiability." Denson had helped raise Newsweek's circulation by 50 percent during his tenure, in part through innovative layouts and graphics, and he brought the same approach to the Tribune. Denson "swept away the old front-page architecture, essentially vertical in structure" and laid out stories horizontally, with unorthodox and sometimes cryptic headlines; large photos and information boxes. The "Densonized" front page sparked a mixed reaction from media professionals and within the newspaper—Tribune copy editor John Price called it "silly but expert silliness" and Time called the new front page "all overblown pictures (and) klaxon headlines"—but the newspaper's circulation jumped in 1961 and those within the Tribune said "the alternative seemed to be the death of the newspaper." The Tribune also launched an ad campaign targeting the Times with the slogan "Who says a good newspaper has to be dull?"

The Tribune's revival came as the Times was bringing on new leadership and facing financial trouble of its own. While the Times picked up 220,000 readers during the 1950s, its profits declined to $348,000 by 1960 due to the costs of an international edition and investments into the newspaper. A western edition of the newspaper, launched in 1961 by new publisher Orvil Dryfoos in an attempt to build the paper's national audience, also proved to be a drain and the Times profits fell to $59,802 by the end of 1961. While the Times outdistanced its rival in circulation and ad lineage, the Tribune continued to draw a sizeable amount of advertising, due to its wealthy readership. The Times management watched the Tribune's changes with "uneasy contempt for their debasement of classic Tribune craftmanship but also with grudging admiration for their catchiness and shrewdness." Times managing editor Turner Catledge began visiting the city room of his newspaper to read the early edition of the Tribune and sometimes responded with changes, though he ultimately decided Denson's approach would be unsuccessful. But the financial challenges both papers faced led Dryfoos, Thayer, and previous Times publisher Arthur Hays Sulzberger to discuss a possible merger of the Times and the Tribune, a project codenamed "Canada" at the Times.

Denson's approaches to the front page often required expensive work stoppages to redo the front page, which increased expenses and drew concern from Whitney and Thayer. Denson also had a heavy-handed approach to the newsroom that led some to question his stability, and led him to clash with Thayer. Denson left the Tribune in October 1962 after Thayer attempted to move the nightly lockup of the newspaper to managing editor James Bellows. But Denson's approach would continue at the paper. Daily circulation at the Tribune reached an all-time high of 412,000 in November, 1962.

=== Labor unrest, New Journalism ===
The New York newspaper industry came to an abrupt halt on December 8, 1962, when the local of the International Typographical Union, led by Bert Powers, walked off the job, leading to the 114-day 1962–63 New York City newspaper strike. The ITU, known as "Big Six", represented 3,800 printers, as well as workers at 600 printshops and 28 publications in the city but, like other newspaper unions, had taken a backseat to the Newspaper Guild (which had the largest membership among the unions) in contract negotiations. This arrangement began to fray in the 1950s, as the craft unions felt the Guild was too inclined to accept publishers' offers without concern for those who did the manual work of printing. Powers wanted to call a strike to challenge the Guild's leadership and thrust ITU to the fore.

New technology was also a concern for management and labor. Teletypesetting (TTS), introduced in the 1950s, was used by The Wall Street Journal and promised to be far more efficient than the linotype machines still used by the Tribune and most other New York newspapers. TTS required less skill than the complex linotype machines, and publishers wanted to automate to save money. ITU was not necessarily opposed to TTS—it trained its members on the new equipment—but wanted to control the rate at which automation occurred; assurances that TTS operators would be paid at the same rates as linotype workers; that at least a portion of the savings from publishers would go toward union pension plans (to allow funding to continue as the workforce and union membership declined) and guarantees that no printer would lose their job as a result of the new technology. Publishers were willing to protect jobs and reduce the workforce through attrition, but balked at what they viewed as "tribute payments" to the unions. After nearly a five-month strike, the unions and the publishers reached an agreement in March, 1963—in which the unions won a weekly worker wage and benefit increase of $12.63 and largely forestalled automation—and the city's newspapers resumed publication on April 1, 1963.

The strike added new costs to all newspapers, and increased the Tribune's losses to $4.2 million while slashing its circulation to 282,000. Dryfoos died of a heart ailment shortly after the strike and was replaced as Times publisher by Arthur Ochs Sulzberger, who ended merger talks with the Tribune because "it just didn't make any long-term sense to me." The paper also lost long-established talent, including Marguerite Higgins, Earl Mazo and Washington bureau chief Robert Donovan. Whitney, however, remained committed to the Tribune, and promoted James Bellows to editor of the newspaper. Bellows kept Denson's format but "eliminated features that lacked substance or sparkle" while promoting new talent, including movie critic Judith Crist and Washington columnists Robert Novak and Rowland Evans.

From 1963 until its demise, the Tribune published a weekly magazine supplement titled Book Week; Susan Sontag published two early essays there. The Tribune also began experimenting with an approach to news that later was referred to as the New Journalism. National editor Dick Wald wrote in one memo "there is no mold for a newspaper story," and Bellows encouraged his reporters to work "in whatever style made them comfortable." Tom Wolfe, who joined the paper after working at The Washington Post, wrote lengthy features about city life; asking an editor how long his pieces should be, he received the reply "until it gets boring." Bellows soon moved Wolfe to the Tribune's new Sunday magazine, New York, edited by Clay Felker. Bellows also prominently featured Jimmy Breslin in the columns of the Tribune, as well as writer Gail Sheehy.

Editorially, the newspaper remained in the liberal Republican camp, both strongly anti-communist, pro-business, and supportive of civil rights. In April 1963, the Tribune published the "Letter from Birmingham Jail", written by Martin Luther King Jr. The Tribune became a target of Barry Goldwater partisans in the 1964 presidential campaign. The leadership of the Tribune, while agreeing with Goldwater's approach to national defense, believed he pushed it to an extreme, and strongly opposed Goldwater's voting record on civil rights. After some internal debate, the Tribune endorsed Democrat Lyndon Johnson for the presidency that fall. The newspaper's editorial support also played a role in the election of New York City Mayor John Lindsay, a liberal Republican, in 1965.

=== Attempted JOA and the death of the Tribune ===
Whitney supported the changes at the Tribune but they did not help the newspaper's bottom line. A survey of readers of the newspaper in late 1963 found that readers "appreciated the Tribune's innovations, (but) the Times still plainly ranked as the prestige paper in the New York field, based mostly on its completeness." Whitney himself was popular with the staff—Breslin called him "the only millionaire I ever rooted for"—and once burst out of his office wondering why the Tribune failed to sell more copies when "there's compelling reading on every page." But a second strike in 1965—which led the Tribune to leave the publishers' association in a desperate attempt to survive—pushed the Tribune's losses to $5 million and led Thayer to conclude the newspaper could no longer survive on its own.

In 1966, Whitney and Thayer attempted to organize what would have been New York's first joint operating agreement (JOA) with the Hearst-owned New York Journal American and the Scripps-owned New York World-Telegram and Sun. Under the proposed agreement, the Herald Tribune would have continued publication as the morning partner and the Journal-American and World-Telegram would merge as the World Journal, an afternoon paper. All three would publish a Sunday edition called the World Journal Tribune. The newspapers would have maintained their own editorial voices (all three of which tended to be conservative). On paper, the JOA, which would have taken effect April 25, 1966, would have led to profits of $4 million to $5 million annually, but would have also led to the loss of 1,764 out of 4,598 employees at the papers. The Newspaper Guild, concerned about the possible job losses, said the new newspaper would have to negotiate a new contract with the union; the publishers refused. The day the JOA was supposed to go into effect, the Guild struck the newly merged newspaper (the Times continued to publish).

The strike, which dragged into August, sealed the Tribune's fate. Half the editorial staff left the newspaper for new jobs during the strike. That summer, Bellows wrote to Matt Meyer, the head of the new company, that it would be "almost impossible—with the present staff—to publish a Herald Tribune I would be proud to be the editor of, or be able to compete with successfully in the morning field." On August 13, with the strike still going on, the management decided to end publication of the Tribune, which Whitney announced in the ninth-floor auditorium of the Tribune building on August 15. "I know we gave something good to our city while we published and I know it will be a loss to journalism in this country as we cease publication," Whitney said. "I am glad that we never tried to cheapen it in any way, that we have served as a conscience and a valuable opposition. I am sorry that it had to end."

The death of The New York Herald Tribune stills a voice that for a century and a quarter exerted a powerful influence in the affairs of nation, state and city. It was a competitor of ours, but a competitor that sought survival on the basis of quality, originality and integrity, rather than sensationalism or doctrinaire partisanship.
"Thirty for the Tribune," The New York Times, August 16, 1966.

The Tribune's demise hastened a settlement of the strike. Discontinued as a morning paper, the Tribune name was added to the afternoon publication and on September 12, 1966, the new World Journal Tribune published its first issue. "It was not a bad paper, but it was a misbegotten thing" according to Tribune historian Richard Kluger, and featured many Tribune writers, including Wolfe, Breslin, Kerr and columnist Dick Schaap, and incorporated New York as its Sunday magazine. The first weeks' editions were dominated by the input of the Hearst and Scripps papers, but after a time, the "Widget" (as the merged publication was nicknamed) took on the appearance and style of the late-era Tribune. The World Journal Tribune reached a circulation near 700,000—fourth-largest for American evening newspapers at the time—but had high overhead costs and relatively little advertising. Whitney eventually withdrew support for the newspaper, but Scripps and Hearst continued to back it until the paper folded on May 5, 1967.

Following the collapse of the World Journal Tribune, The New York Times and The Washington Post became joint owners with Whitney of the Herald Tribune's European edition, the International Herald Tribune, which is still published under full ownership by the Times, which bought out the Post holdings in 2003 and changed the paper's name to the International New York Times in 2013. In 1968, New York editor Clay Felker organized a group of investors who bought the name and rights to New York, and successfully revived the weekly as an independent magazine.

== Book and Author Luncheon ==
From 1938 to 1966, the Herald Tribune participated in the American Booksellers Association's popular Book and Author Luncheons. The luncheons were held eight times per year at the Waldorf Astoria and were hosted by the Herald Tribune's literary editor, Irita Bradford Van Doren. Van Doren also selected its guests, typically three per event, who included Jane Jacobs, Vladimir Nabokov, Robert Moses, Rachel Carson, and John Kenneth Galbraith, among others. Radio broadcasts of the luncheon aired on WNYC from 1948 to 1968 (two years after the Herald Tribune's demise).

== New York Herald Tribune Syndicate ==
The New York Herald Tribune Syndicate distributed comic strips and newspaper columns. The syndicate dates back to at least 1914, when it was part of the New York Tribune. The Syndicate's most notable strips were Clare Briggs' Mr. and Mrs., Harry Haenigsen's Our Bill, and Penny, Mell Lazarus' Miss Peach, and Johnny Hart's B.C. Syndicated columns included Weare Holbrook's "Soundings" and John Crosby's radio and television column.

In 1963, Herald Tribune publisher John Hay Whitney (who also owned the Chicago-based Field Enterprises) acquired the Chicago-based Publishers Syndicate, merging Publishers' existing syndication operations with the New York Herald Tribune Syndicate, Field's Chicago Sun-Times Syndicate, and the syndicate of the Chicago Daily News (a newspaper that had been acquired by Field Enterprises in 1959).

In 1966, when the New York Herald Tribune folded, Publishers Syndicate inherited the New York Herald Tribune Syndicate strips, including B.C., Miss Peach, and Penny.

== European edition ==
The merger that created the Herald Tribune in 1924 also included bringing along the European edition of the New York Herald, commonly known as the Paris Herald, an edition that was produced in Paris and had an established reputation.

For a while after 1924, the front-page masthead retained the title The New York Herald, with the subtitle European Edition Of The New York Herald Tribune. This was in part to avoid confusion with the European edition of the Chicago Tribune, which was a competitor publication; this was resolved in 1934 when the owners of the Herald Tribune bought the European edition of the Chicago paper. The merger became effective December 1, 1934. Subsequently, the masthead carried the full New York Herald Tribune title, with the subtitle European Edition. In any case, throughout its lifetime, the European edition was often referred to as the Paris Herald Tribune, or just the Paris Herald.

In the pre-World War II years the European edition was known for its feature stories. The edition looked positively on the emergence of European fascism, cheering on the Italian invasion of Ethiopia as well as the German remilitarization of the Rhineland and annexation of Austria and calling for a fascist party to exist in the United States.

This carried on until April 1939, when the New York paper required the Paris one to hew to its editorial line. The European edition was the last newspaper to publish in Paris before the city fell in June 1940.

Following the liberation of Paris four years later, it resumed publication on December 22, 1944. In the years after the war, it was initially profitable, then not, then did better again when it began publishing the first columns by humorist Art Buchwald, who subsequently became a popular syndicated columnist. Later, the European edition took on more serious reporting while also employing what has been described as "breezy promotion tactics". Herald Tribune owner John Hay Whitney began taking an active interest in the European edition in 1961. The International Edition of The New York Times was a competitor of sorts, and by 1964 had a circulation of some 32,000 although it attracted little advertising. As a commercial proposition it was inferior to the European edition of the Herald Tribune, which had a circulation of around 50,000 and more advertising in it. In general, the European edition of the Herald Tribune was considered the stronger publication.

The European edition was not involved in the complex multi-paper merger discussions of 1966, and did not shut down when it was announced on August 15, 1966, that the New York Herald Tribune would not continue. Instead, earlier that month on August 4, it had been announced that The Washington Post was buying a 45 percent interest in the European edition, and that once the deal was closed it would begin publishing as The International Edition of the New York Herald Tribune–The Washington Post. The change became official in early December 1966. As Buchwald wrote about the ungainly title in his column, "if you ask for it under that name at the airport you'll miss your plane."

During the following year, the publisher of The New York Times gave up on its own international edition. Instead, the Times invested jointly and equally with Whitney Communications and The Washington Post to create a new paper, the International Herald Tribune. The first issue of the International Herald Tribune was published on May 22, 1967; in appearance it was very similar to the European edition of the New York Herald Tribune.

== Awards and cultural references ==
In the 1920s, the New York Herald Tribune established one of the first book review sections that reviewed children's books, and in 1937, the newspaper established the Children's Spring Book Festival Award for the best children's book of the previous year, awarded for three target age groups: 4–8, 8–12, and 12–16. This was the second nationwide children's book award, after the Newbery Medal.

At an event in Washington, on November 23, 1946, Secretary of War Robert P. Patterson honored 82 war correspondents. 18 of them had been employees of the New York Herald Tribune. They were Howard Barnes, Homer Bigart, Herbert Clark, Joseph F. Driscoll, Joseph Evans, Lewis Gannett, Marguerite Higgins, Russell Hill, John D. O'Reilly, Geoffrey Parsons, John C. Smith, John Steinbeck, Dorothy Thompson, Sonia Tomora, Thomas Twitty, William W. White, and Gill Robb Wilson.

In Jean-Luc Godard's 1960 film Breathless, the lead female character Patricia (Jean Seberg) is an American student journalist who sells the European edition on the streets of Paris. She periodically calls out "New York Herald Tribune!" while engaged in conversation with her love interest, the wandering criminal Michel (Jean-Paul Belmondo).

== The "Dingbat" ==
For more than a century, the logo of the New York Herald-Tribune, and its later successor, the International Herald Tribune, featured a hand-drawn "dingbat" between the words Herald and Tribune, which first originated as part of the front page logotype of the Tribune on April 10, 1866. The "dingbat" was replaced with an all-text header beginning with the issue of May 21, 2008, to give a "more contemporary and concise presentation that is consistent with our digital platforms." The drawing included a clock in the center, set to 6:12 p.m., and two figures on either side of it, a toga-clad thinker facing leftward and a young child holding an American flag marching rightward. An eagle spreading its wings was perched atop the clock. The dingbat served as an allegorical device to depict antiquity on the left and the progressive American spirit on the right. The significance of the clock's time remains a mystery.

== See also ==
- List of newspapers in New York
