= Elisabeth Mills Reid =

American philanthropist (1858–1931)

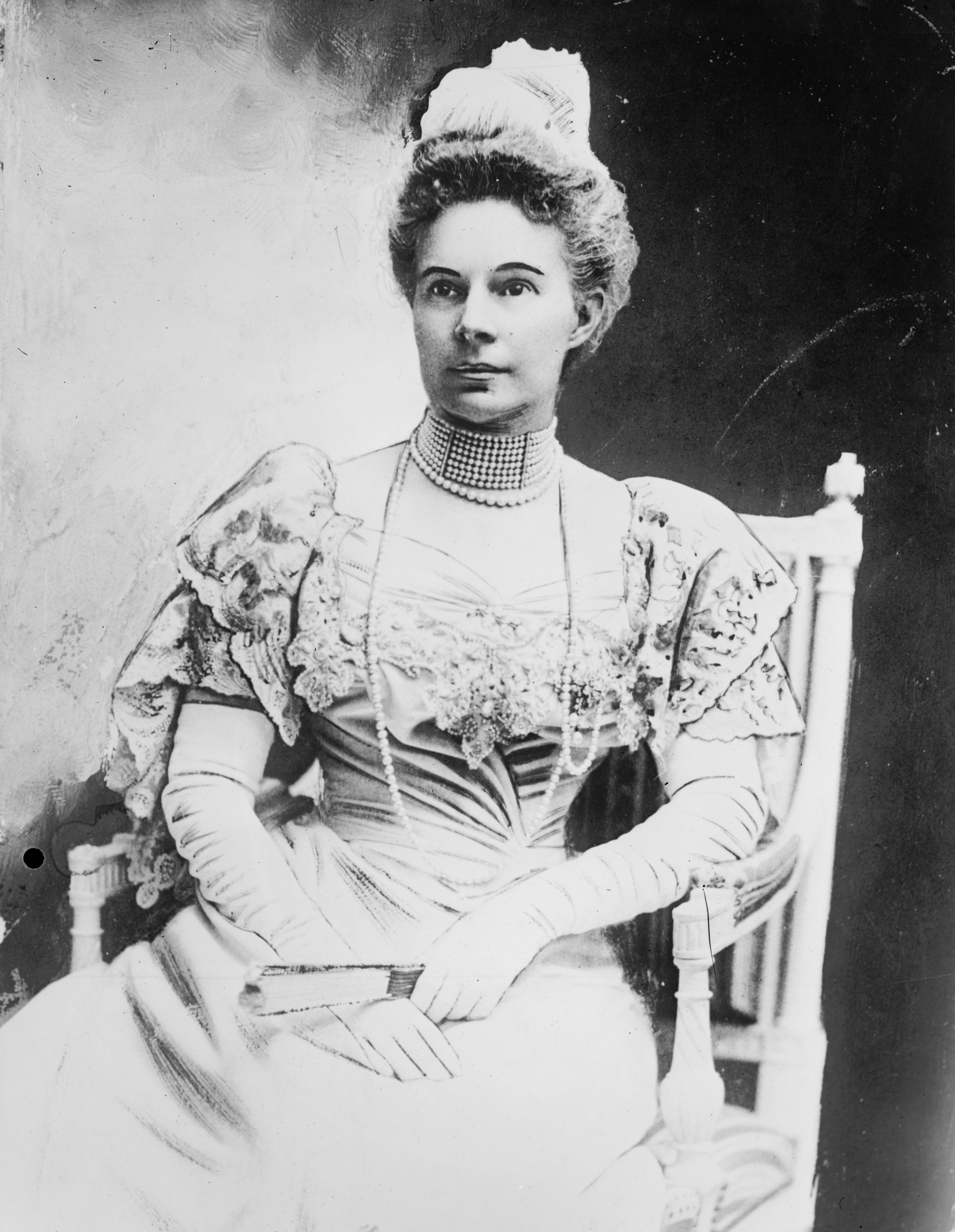
- Portrait of Elisabeth Mills Reid (c. 1900)
- Born: Elisabeth Mills; January 6, 1858; New York City, U.S.
- Died: April 29, 1931 (aged 73); Saint-Jean-Cap-Ferrat, Provence-Alpes-Côte d'Azur, France
- Occupation: Philanthropist
- Spouse: Whitelaw Reid (m. 1881; died 1912)
- Children: Ogden Mills Reid (son); Jean Templeton Ward (daughter)
- Father: Darius Ogden Mills
- Relatives: Beatrice Forbes (niece); Ogden Mills (brother); Ogden L. Mills (nephew); Gladys Mills Phipps (niece); Ogden Reid (grandson); Whitelaw Reid (grandson)
- Family: Reid family

Elisabeth Mills Reid (January 6, 1858 – April 29, 1931) was an American philanthropist. Mills was the daughter of Darius Ogden Mills, a wealthy banker and financier who made his initial fortune during the California gold rush. She was born in New York City and raised between northern California and the Hudson Valley in New York. She married the journalist Whitelaw Reid in 1881, with whom she had two children, Ogden Mills Reid and Jean Templeton Ward. Reid and her family lived at 451 Madison Avenue in New York City, in Paris where Whitelaw was the United States Minister to France, and in London where he was the United States Ambassador to the United Kingdom. Elisabeth founded the American Girls' Club in Paris during her time there, and she was a popular society hostess in London. During her life, Reid was an active philanthropist and a volunteer organizer with the American Red Cross.

== Biography ==
Elisabeth Mills was born on January 6, 1858, in New York City. Her father, Darius Ogden Mills (1825–1910), was a mining operator, banker, and financier who made his initial fortune in Stockton, California, during the California gold rush. Her mother, Jane Templeton (née Cunningham) Mills, was the daughter of the shipbuilder James Cunningham. Her brother, Ogden Mills (1856–1929), was a financier and Thoroughbred racehorse owner. Mills was raised between Sacramento and her father's estate in Millbrae, California, as well as her maternal grandparents' home in the New York Hudson Valley. She was educated by governesses, Anna Brackett's School for Girls in New York City, and a collège operated by Aline Valette in Paris. During her time in Paris, Mills became a member of the American community in Paris. She attended the American Cathedral in Paris, where she was confirmed into the Episcopalian Church in 1874.

In the late 1870s, Mills met Whitelaw Reid (1837–1911), the owner and editor of the New York Tribune, when Reid was visiting her father to discuss matters relating to their Republican Party donations. Mills and Reid wrote to one another for two years, at which point Reid proposed. According to the art historian Jennifer Dasal, "theirs was a love match", notwithstanding their age difference of 20 years and gap in wealth. On April 16, 1881, aged 23, Mills married Reid, aged 43. They had two children, in 1882 and 1884. Their son Ogden Mills Reid (1882–1947) married Helen Miles Rogers, who had traveled with his mother as her secretary and assistant, in 1911; Ogden was president of the Tribune until his death in 1947, after which Helen was president until her death in 1970. Their daughter, Jean Templeton Ward (1884–1962), was a philanthropist and society hostess; she married John Hubert Ward (1870–1938) in 1908.

In 1886, Ogden Mills purchased 451 Madison Avenue, the New York City residence of the recently bankrupt railroad executive Henry Villard, for Reid and her husband. (Note: The selling price of the house was estimated at $350 or $400 thousand ($12–15 million in 2025). (Note: 1634–1699: McCusker, J. J. (1997). How Much Is That in Real Money? A Historical Price Index for Use as a Deflator of Money Values in the Economy of the United States: Addenda et Corrigenda (PDF). American Antiquarian Society. 1700–1799: McCusker, J. J. (1992). How Much Is That in Real Money? A Historical Price Index for Use as a Deflator of Money Values in the Economy of the United States (PDF). American Antiquarian Society. 1800–present: Federal Reserve Bank of Minneapolis. "Consumer Price Index (estimate) 1800–".)) The obituary writer Alden Whitman wrote: "The Reids lived sumptuously in a Florentine fortress on Madison Avenue, with a dinner table for eighty and the wealth and social prestige to fill it with interesting people."

In 1889, Whitelaw was appointed the United States Minister to France. In Paris, Elisabeth was a society hostess. She also reintegrated herself into the American community in Paris. In 1892, the Reids returned to the United States, where Whitelaw unsuccessfully ran for Vice President of the United States. They then moved to London when Whitelaw was appointed United States Ambassador to the United Kingdom in 1905. In London, Elisabeth hosted popular high society functions at Dorchester House, the ambassador's residence, and befriended British royalty, including Edward VII and Queen Alexandra. Elisabeth's entry in Notable American Women, 1607–1950 states that she "moved in diplomatic circles with ease".

In 1910, when her father died, Reid and her brother equally inherited his estate, valued at approximately $500–600 million ($17–21 billion in 2025). Whitelaw then died on December 15, 1912, leaving operation of the Tribune to their son and most of his wealth to Elisabeth. By 1920, Elisabeth was still living at 451 Madison Avenue, where she employed "17 servants, including four footmen and two French-born cooks".

Elisabeth died on April 29, 1931, aged 73, at her daughter's villa in Saint-Jean-Cap-Ferrat after contracting pneumonia. A memorial service was held for her at the American Cathedral in Paris and her funeral was held at Cathedral of St. John the Divine in New York City. She was buried in Sleepy Hollow Cemetery in Tarrytown, New York. In 1934, her estate was appraised at approximately $20 million gross ($691 million in 2025) and $19 million net ($657 million in 2025), and it was reported that she had gifted her children approximately $17 million ($587 million in 2025) during her lifetime.

== Philanthropy ==
Elisabeth Mills Reid was an active philanthropist. She served on the Bellevue Hospital Board of Women Managers; funded construction of a hospital in San Mateo and St. Luke's Hospital in San Francisco. She also funded and served on the boards of training schools for nurses.

Reid also served in organizational roles the American Red Cross, working on its rural nursing program, and during the Spanish-American War and World War I. At the outset of World War I, she funded the construction of an officers' hospital in Paris, France, which later became the site of the American Girls' Club in Paris at the urging of her daughter-in-law. Upon her death, the American Journal of Nursing wrote that "[m]any American nurses have vivid recollections of the painstaking way in which she outfitted them, provided for their comfort, [and] helped them to do their part in the great endeavor".

== American Girls' Club ==
Reid, with Helen Newell, founded the American Girls' Club in Paris, a place where women scholars from the United States could meet French academics. The Club was hosted in a property owned by Reid that she had initially granted to the Red Cross for use as an officers' hospital during World War I. In 1927, she gifted the property to her daughter-in-law, Helen Rogers Reid, who named it Reid Hall after her mother-in-law.

== Sources ==
=== Books and encyclopedias ===
- Hilton, George W. (February 2000) [1999]. "Mills, Darius Ogden". In Chávez-García, Miroslava (ed.). American National Biography. Oxford University Press. ISBN 978-0-198-60669-7.
- Milowski, Raymond S. (1971). "Reid, Elisabeth Mills". In James, Edward T. (ed.). Notable American Women, 1607–1950. Cambridge, Mass.: Belknap Press. ISBN 978-0-674-62734-5.
- Dasal, Jennifer (2025). The Club: Where American Women Artists Found Refuge in Belle Époque Paris. London: Bloomsbury Publishing. ISBN 978-1-63-973130-5.
- Riccards, Michael P. (February 2000) [1999]. "Reid, Whitelaw". In Chávez-García, Miroslava (ed.). American National Biography. Oxford University Press. ISBN 978-0-198-60669-7.
- Shopsin, William C.; Broderick, Mosette Glaser (1980). The Villard Houses: Life Story of a Landmark. New York: Viking Press. ISBN 978-0-670-74685-9 – via Internet Archive.
- Whitman, Alden (1980). "Reid, Helen Miles Rogers". In Sicherman, Barbara; Green, Carol Hurd (eds.). Notable American Women: The Modern Period. Cambridge, Mass.: Belknap Press. pp. 574–575. ISBN 978-0-674-62733-8.
- Tauranac, John (1985). Elegant New York. New York: Abbeville Press. ISBN 978-0-89659-458-6.
- Woloch, Nancy (2022). The Insider: A Life of Virginia C. Gildersleeve. New York: Columbia University Press. doi:10.7312/wolo20424. ISBN 978-0-231-55544-9 – via De Gruyter Brill.

=== Journal articles ===
- "Elisabeth Mills (Mrs. Whitelaw) Reid: 1858–1931". American Journal of Nursing. 31 (6): 716–717. June 1931. JSTOR 3410019.
- Dennison, Mariea Caudill (2005). "The American Girls' Club in Paris: The Propriety and Imprudence of Art Students, 1890–1914". Woman's Art Journal. 26 (1): 32–37. JSTOR 3566532.

=== Newspapers ===
- "Lady Ward Dead; Aided Charities". The New York Times. Associated Press. May 3, 1962. p. 33. ProQuest 116104869.
- "Villard's Mansion Sold to Whitelaw Reid". Democrat and Chronicle. October 16, 1886. p. 2. Archived from the original on July 9, 2021 – via newspapers.com.
- "Ogden Mills Dies at His Home Here". The New York Times. January 29, 1929. p. 8.
- "Mrs. Whitelaw Reid Is Dead in France". The New York Times. April 30, 1931. p. 23.
- "Mrs. Reid's Estate Totals $18,589,916". The New York Times. May 26, 1934. p. 6. Archived from the original on July 3, 2025.
- "Sir John Ward, 68, Is Dead in London". The New York Times. December 3, 1938. p. 19. ProQuest 102481504.
- "Ogden Mills Reid of Herald Tribune Dies of Pneumonia". The New York Times. January 4, 1947. pp. 1, 16. ProQuest 107870021.
- "Mrs. Ogden Reid Dies Here at 87". The New York Times. January 28, 1970. pp. 1, 18. Archived from the original on December 26, 2024.
- Gray, Christopher (December 21, 2003). "Streetscapes/Madison Avenue Between 50th and 51st Street; A Landmark 6-Home Complex in Dark Brownstone". The New York Times. Archived from the original on May 23, 2025.
- "Sold for a Song: Whitelaw Reid Purchases Henry Villard's Palatial for $400,000". St. Louis Post-Dispatch. October 16, 1886. p. 4. ProQuest 578805390.
