= Emma Cheves Wilkins =

American painter

Emma Cheves Wilkins (1870–1956) was an American painter who played a major role in the art scene in Savannah, Georgia during the early twentieth century. Her works can be found in the permanent collections of Armstrong State University in Savannah, the Morris Museum of Art in Augusta, the Telfair Museum of Art in Savannah, and in private collections.

== Background ==
Emma Cheves Wilkins was born on December 10, 1870, the first child of Emma Cheves and Gilbert A. Wilkins. She was a lifelong resident of Savannah, Georgia and inherited the artistic talents of her mother and grandmother. She studied at the Telfair Academy under Carl Brandt. Alongside her mother in the 1890s, Wilkins taught art lessons at a studio in Savannah as the market for her artwork extended. As a self-sustaining artist, Wilkins painted portraits of judges, politicians, bankers, doctors, and to a lesser extent of women and children.

Wilkins traveled to Paris in 1896 with fellow Savannah artist Lucile Desbouillons. The pair lived at the American Girls' Club for a few months and were enrolled in Gustave-Claude-Etienne Courtois and Louis-Auguste Girardot's classes for foreigners at the Académie Colarossi. In the 1900s, she began restorative artwork on several paintings. Wilkins also exhibited her work frequently. In 1931, she was awarded a prize for the "best local subject painted in or around Savannah" for a work she exhibited at the eleventh annual exhibition of the Southern States Art League.
