= Carl Brandt =

Carl Brandt may refer to:

- Carl Brandt (composer) (1914–1991), American composer and arranger, prolific with TV studios, film, and recording artists
- Carl Ludwig Brandt (1831–1905), German-born artist who worked mostly in the United States
- Charlie Brandt (1957–2004), American serial killer

== See also ==
- Karl Brandt (disambiguation)
- Brandt (surname)
