= Telfair Square (Savannah, Georgia) =

Public square in Savannah, Georgia

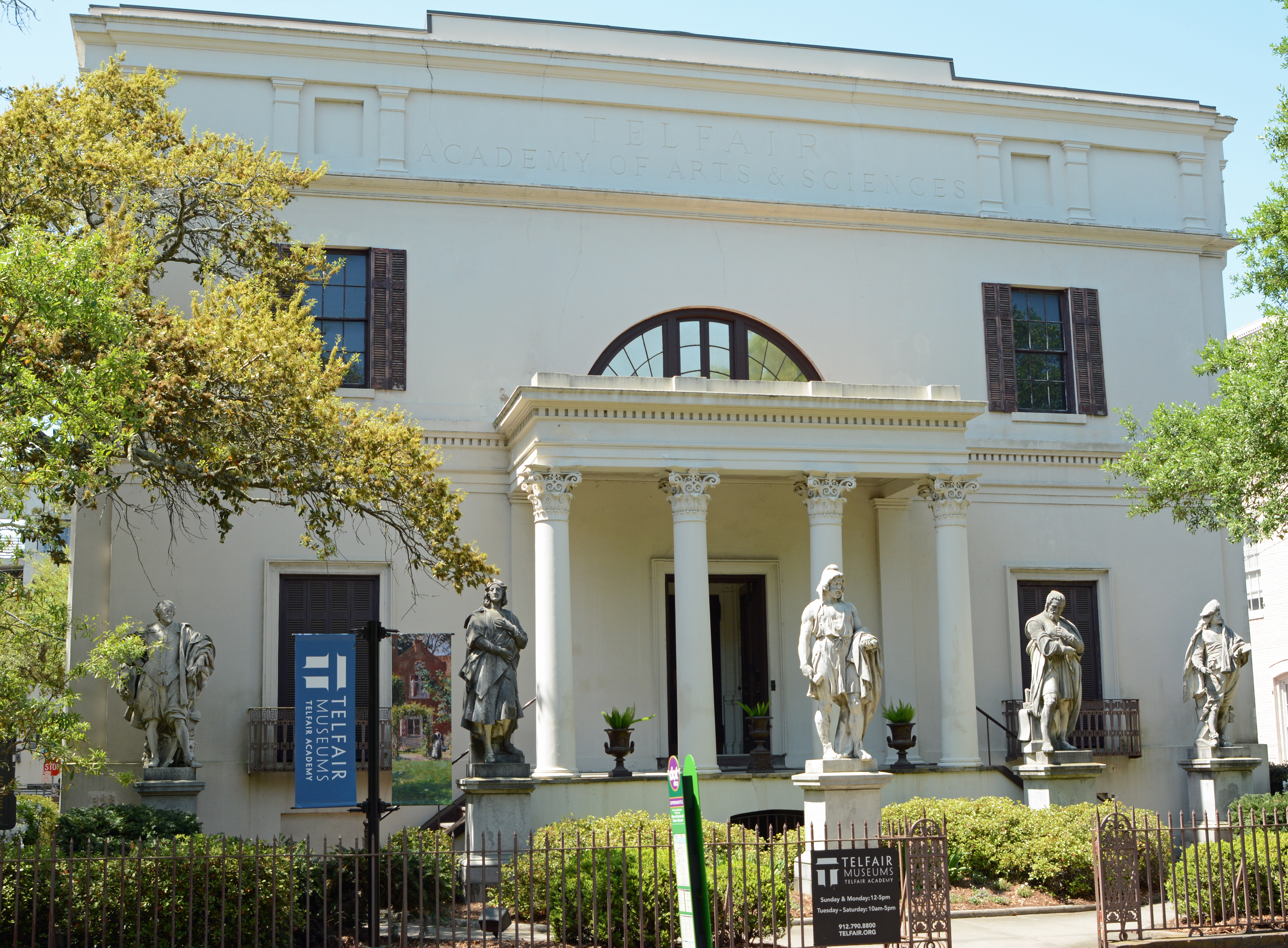
- Telfair Academy, in the northwest civic/trust block of the square
- Interactive map of Telfair Square
- Former name: St. James Square
- Namesake: Telfair family
- Maintained by: City of Savannah
- Location: Savannah, Georgia, U.S.
- Coordinates: 32.0785°N 81.0945°W
- North: Barnard Street
- East: West President Street
- South: Barnard Street
- West: West President Street

Construction
- Completion: 1733 (293 years ago)

Telfair Square is one of the 22 squares of Savannah, Georgia, United States. It is located in the second row of the city's five rows of squares, on Barnard Street and West President Street, and was laid out in 1733 as one of the first four squares. It is south of Ellis Square, west of Wright Square and north of Orleans Square. Liberty Square formerly stood to its west but was later paved over. The oldest building on the square is Telfair Academy, at 121 Barnard Street, which dates to 1818–1820.

Originally named St. James Square, in honor of a green space in London, and marked one of the most fashionable neighborhoods in early Savannah, it was renamed in 1883 to honor the Telfair family. It is the only square honoring a family rather than an individual or an event. The Telfairs included former governor of Georgia Edward Telfair, Congressman Thomas Telfair (Edward Telfair's son), and his daughter Mary Telfair (1791–1875), benefactor of Savannah's Telfair Museum of Art. The square also contains tributes to the Girl Scouts of the USA, founded by Savannahian Juliette Gordon Low, and to the chambered nautilus.

== Dedication ==
Namesake	Image	Note
Telfair family		Scottish-born Edward Telfair (1735–1807), part of the family for whom the square is named.

== Constituent buildings ==
Each building below is in one of the eight blocks around the square composed of four residential "tything" blocks and four civic ("trust") blocks, now known as the Oglethorpe Plan. They are listed with construction years where known.

Three of the blocks have no notable buildings, according to a study by the Historic Preservation Department of the Chatham County-Savannah Metropolitan Planning Commission, hence only five are inventoried below.

Northwestern residential/tything block

- 110 Jefferson Street (1930)
- 218 West State Street (1904)
- 223 (1–6) West Broughton Street (1896/1920)
- 223 (A) West Broughton Street (1917)
- 221 West Broughton Street (1901)
- 217 West Broughton Street (1901)
- 203–207 West Broughton Street (1889)
- 201 West Broughton Street (1900)

Southwestern civic/trust block

- Trinity Methodist Church, 127 Barnard Street (1848)

Northwestern civic/trust block

- Telfair Academy, 121 Barnard Street (1820) – by William Jay; part of Telfair Museums (enlarged and altered in the 1880s); oldest building on the square

Southwestern residential/tything block

- 136 Jefferson Street (1884)
- Robert Walker Row House, 213–223 West York Street (1905)

Northeastern residential/tything block

- Henry Hayme Building, 114 Barnard Street (1889)
- 122 West State Street (1889)
- 110 West State Street (1889)
- 109–119 Whitaker Street (1890)
- 236 West Broughton Street (1889)
- 121 West Broughton Street (1889)
- 117–119 West Broughton Street (1890)
- 113 West Broughton Street (1890)
- 109 West Broughton Street (1975)
- 107 West Broughton Street (1935)
- 105 West Broughton Street (1866)

== Gallery ==
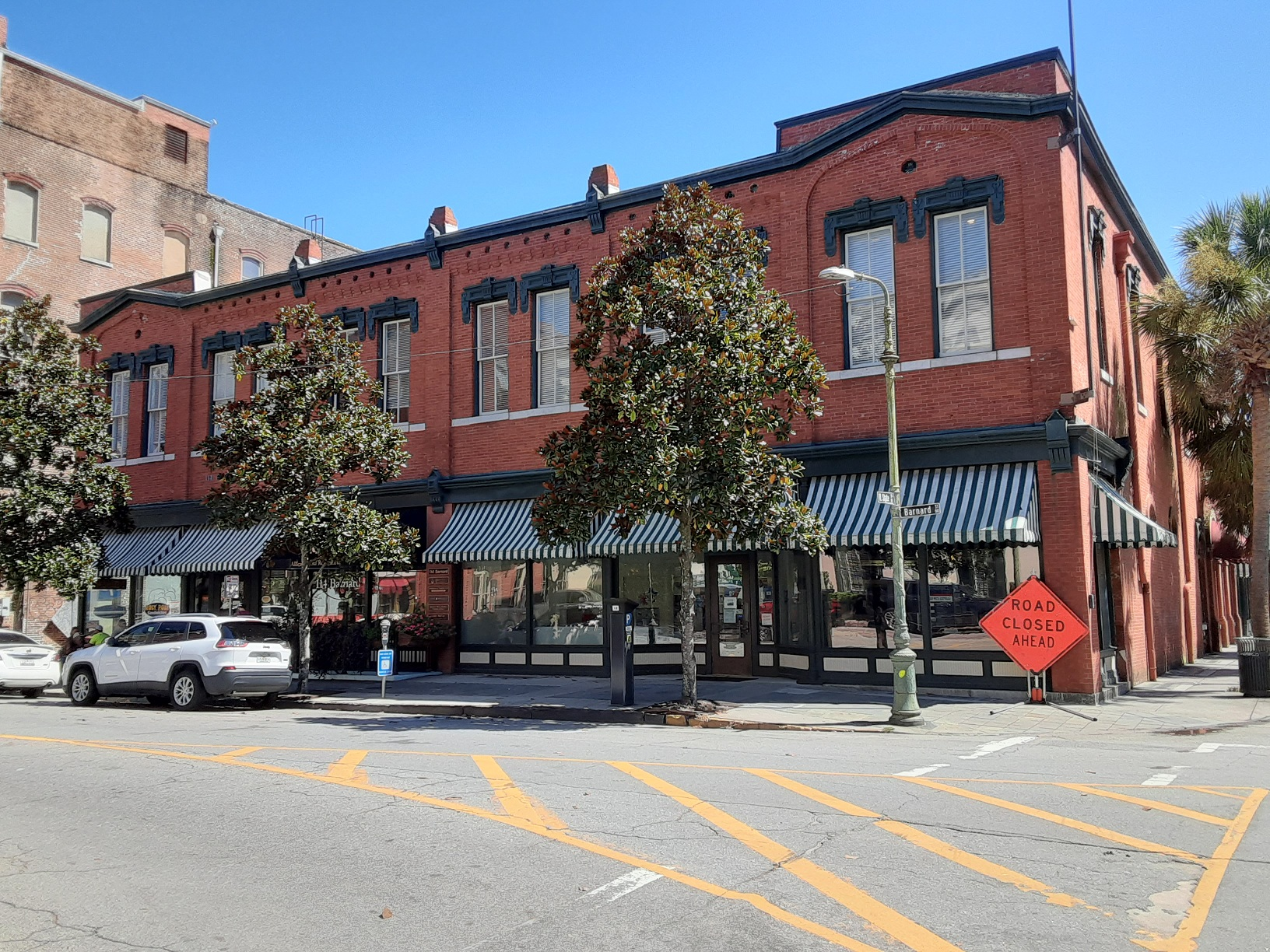
Henry Hayme Building, 114 Barnard Street

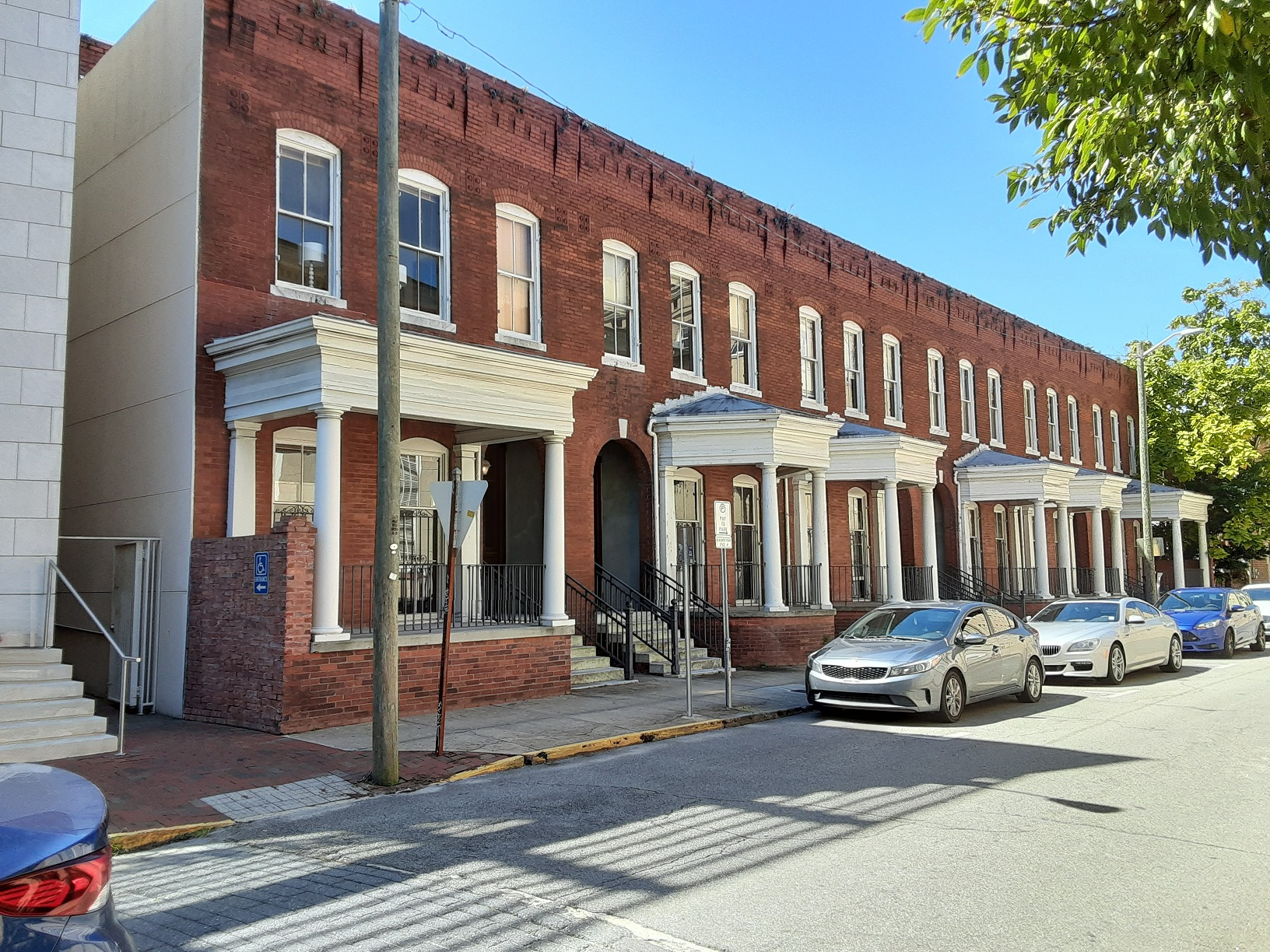
Robert Walker Row House, 213–223 West York Street

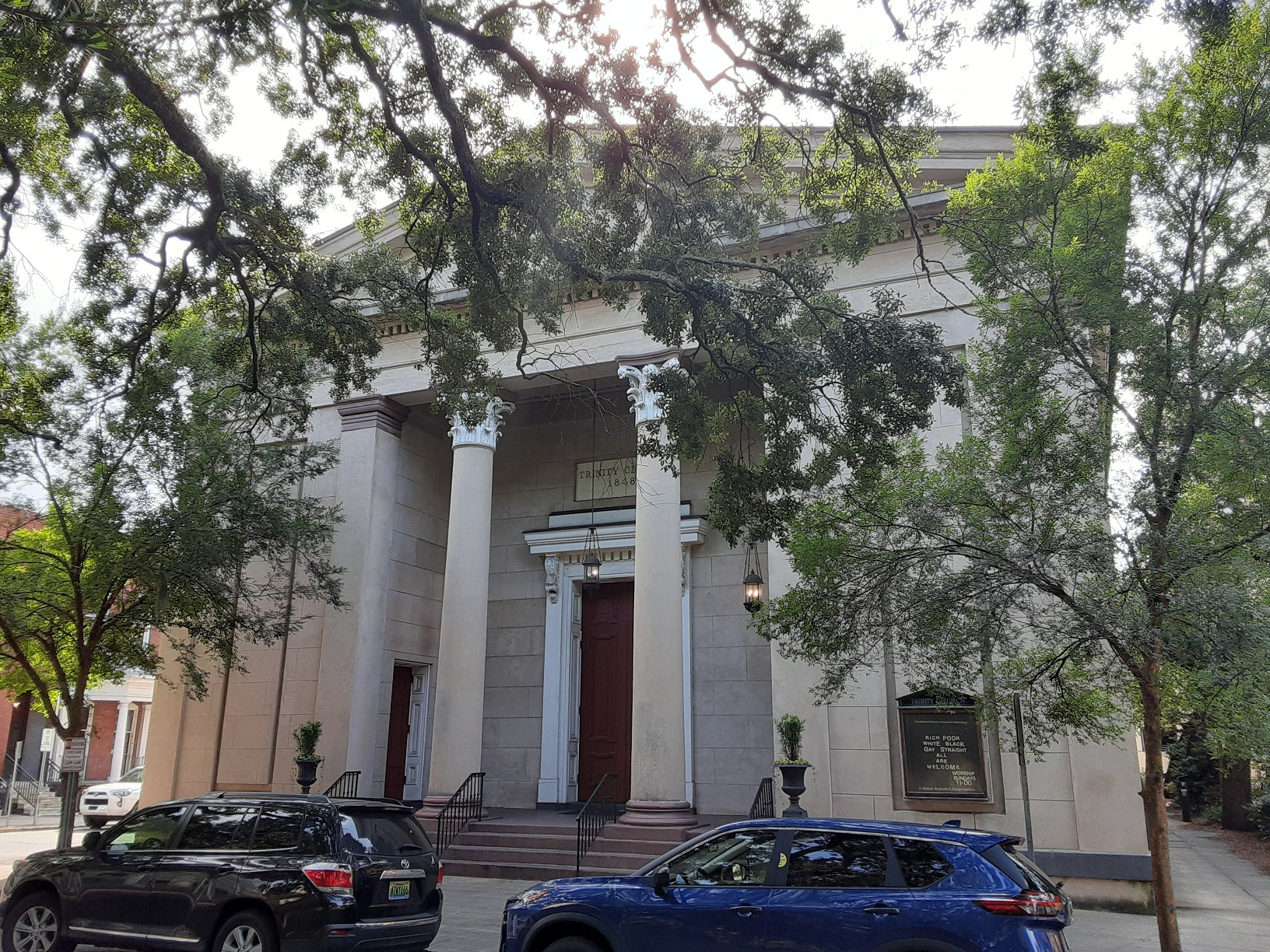
Trinity Methodist Church, 127 Barnard Street

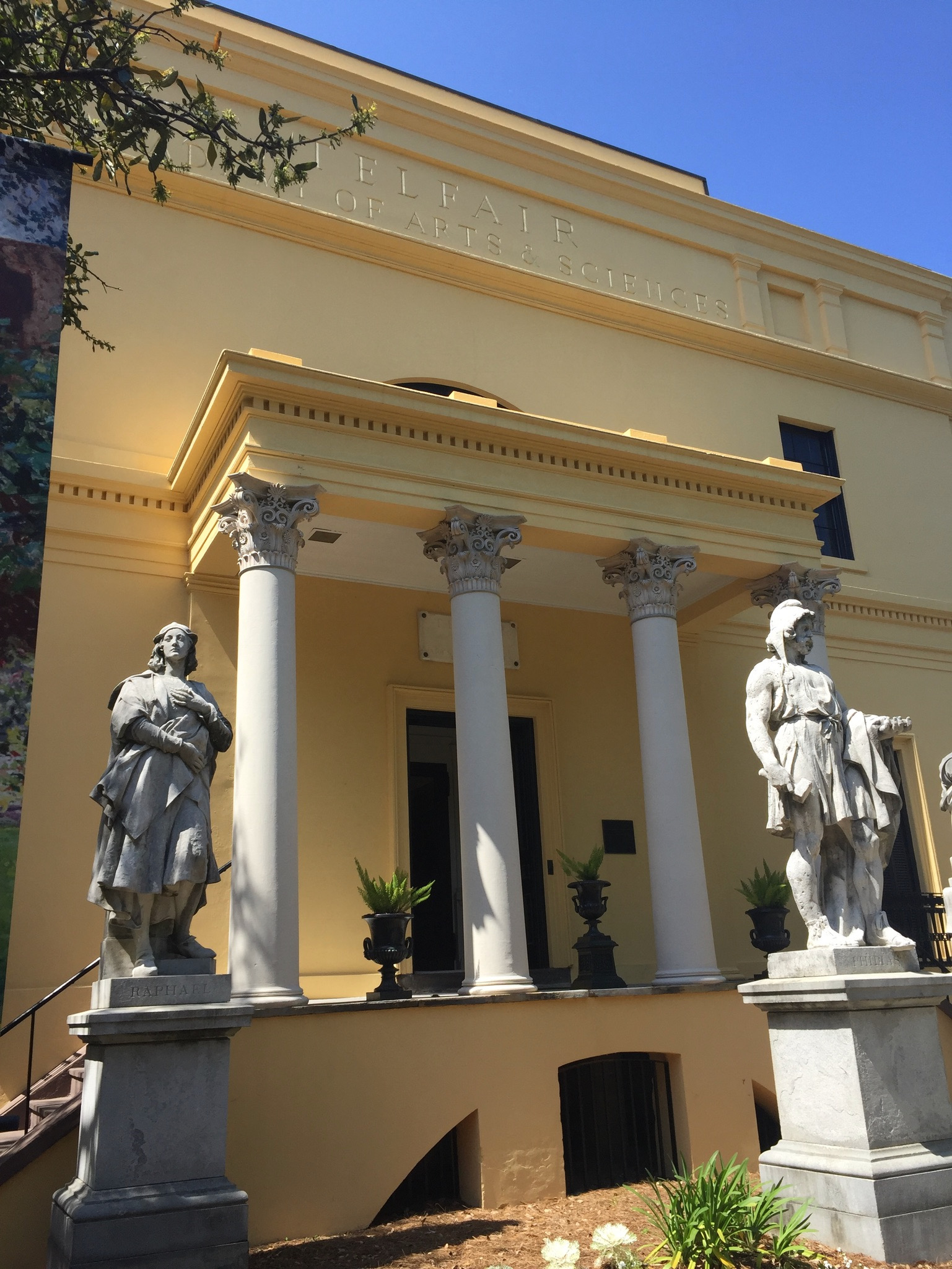
A closer view of Telfair Academy, 121 Barnard Street
