= Wetter House =

Historic house in Savannah, Georgia

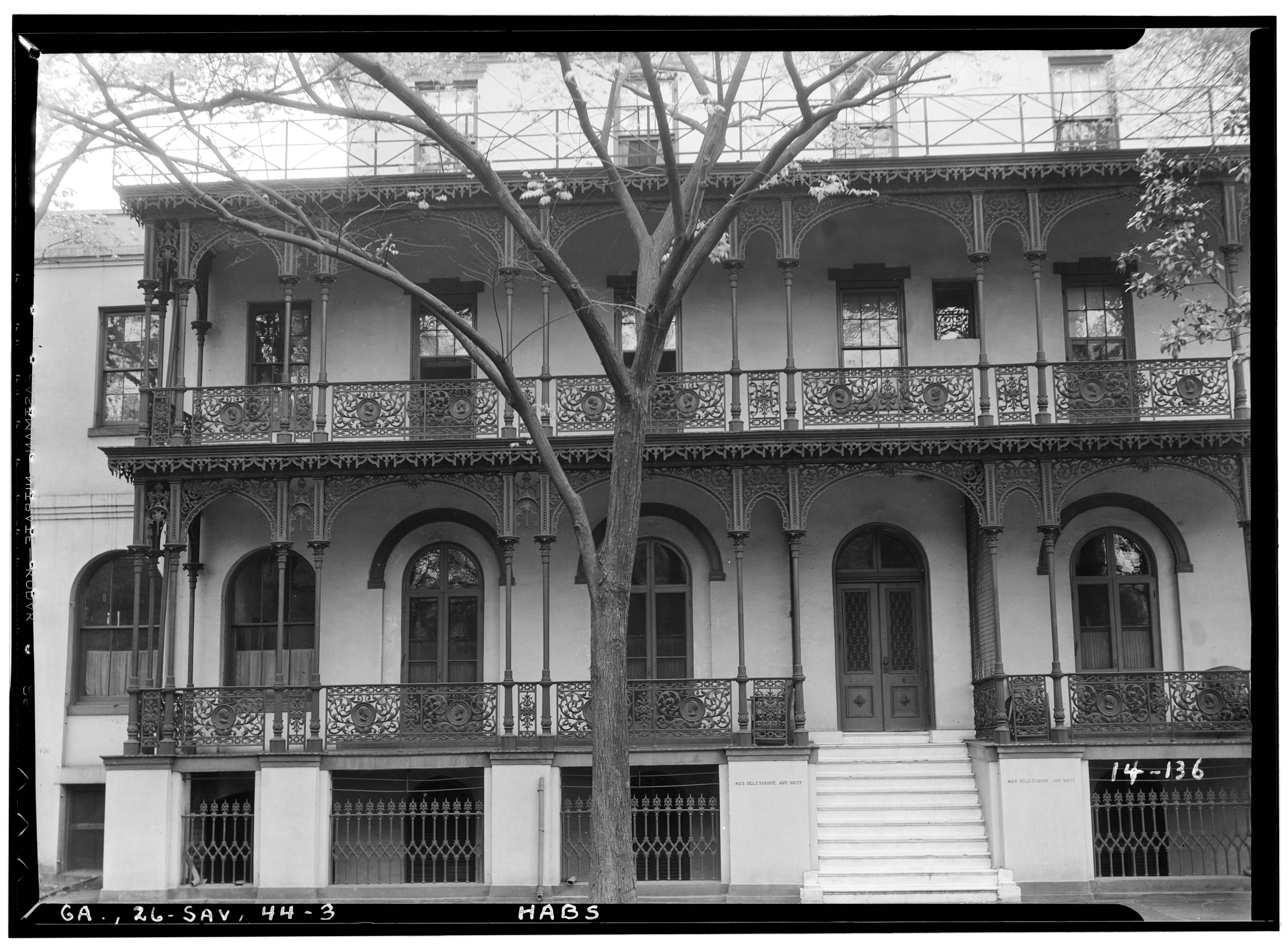
- Wetter House in 1936
- Interactive map of the Wetter House area

General information
- Type: residence
- Location: Savannah, Georgia, U.S., 425 West Oglethorpe Avenue
- Coordinates: 32.0781°N 81.0978°W
- Construction started: 1822
- Completed: 1857
- Demolished: 1950

Technical details
- Floor count: 4

The Wetter House was a residence in Savannah, Georgia, United States. Originally built in 1822, it was expanded and remodeled in 1857 for Augustus Wetter, a Savannah architect and businessman. Its demolition in 1950 was an impetus for the formation of the Historic Savannah Foundation in 1955.

== House ==
The house was at 425 West Oglethorpe Avenue, at its junction with Martin Luther King Jr. Boulevard; its original address was 215 South Broad Street. It was originally built as a three-storey stucco building for Anthony Barclay, next door to a mansion owned by Mary Magdalene Marshall. Marshall's adopted daughter, Margaret, married Anthony's son, Adalbert in 1855. From 1837, the property was owned by Margaret Telfair. Augustus Wetter, who acquired it in 1857 on his marriage to Alberta Telfair, had it remodeled and added cast iron balconies by Wood & Perot of Philadelphia, which included 50 medallions portraying poets, artists, and statesmen. The ironwork cost $100,000 and had been created for the Georgia state capitol at Milledgeville, but was reportedly rejected as too expensive. In 1862, during the Civil War, the house was briefly the headquarters of Confederate Army general Robert E. Lee, and Confederate President Jefferson Davis was a friend of Wetter's and a frequent visitor.

The final use of the building was by the Savannah Female Asylum and Orphanage. In 1950, a Chevrolet dealership built a new showroom across the street from the house, bought it, and demolished it to make use of the site. Some interior decoration, such as mantlepieces, was sold, and the decorative ironwork was donated to the orphanage to sell for fundraising.

Only a section of wall survives from the Wetter House. Its demolition, along with that of the City Market, sparked the formation of the Historic Savannah Foundation in 1955. The site is now within the Savannah Historic District, which was declared a National Historic Landmark District in 1966.

== Augustus Wetter ==
Augustus Peter Wetter was born in Mentz, Germany, in 1829. He emigrated to the United States, arriving in Savannah before the Civil War. He worked as a civil engineer under General Jeremy Francis Gilmer and was also a captain of the DeKalb Riflemen, part of the Chatham Artillery.

On April 21, 1857, Wetter married Sarah Alberta Cobb Telfair (April 5, 1834 – 1866), daughter of Pierce Cobb and Mary Eliza Telfair. She had previously, while a minor, married Charles S. Arnold, and the couple had divorced after a few years.

In 1859, Wetter purchased the 200 acres (81 ha) Sharon Plantation, just outside Savannah on land bounded by Louisville Road and the Ogeechee Canal. In November 1870, with Eugene Kelly and six others, he was a founding member of the Southern Bank of the State of Georgia.

Augustus and Alberta Wetter had four children, sons Edward and Conrad and daughters Mary ("Meta") Martha and Louisa Alberta. Alberta Wetter died on July 28, 1866, aged around 32. Her great-aunt Mary Telfair died in 1875, bequeathing $21,000 to the Wetters' daughters via a trust. Wetter challenged the will in court, claiming that she was "mentally incompetent" and suffering from monomania to the detriment of others, and demanding $10 million for his children from the estate. His case reached the Supreme Court but failed.

In the mid-to-late 1870s, Wetter's financial situation declined; his mortgage was foreclosed in December 1877. On September 30, 1878, his daughter Meta died at the age of 17. He died on September 8, 1882, in Harrisburg, Pennsylvania, at the home of one of his children. He was aged around 53. His funeral took place on September 12 at Savannah's Independent Presbyterian Church, and he was interred at the Sharon Plantation.

== 1934 photographs ==
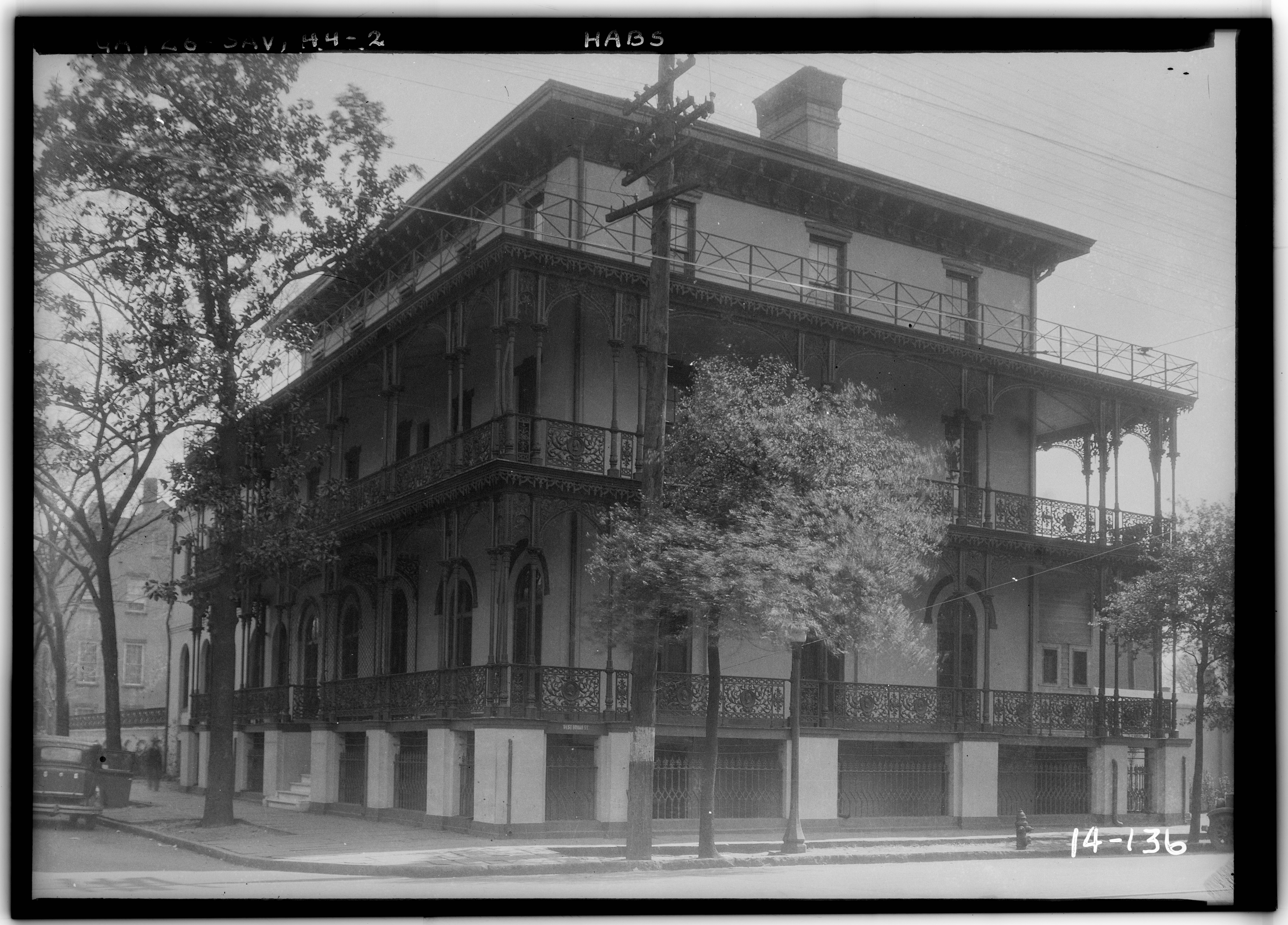

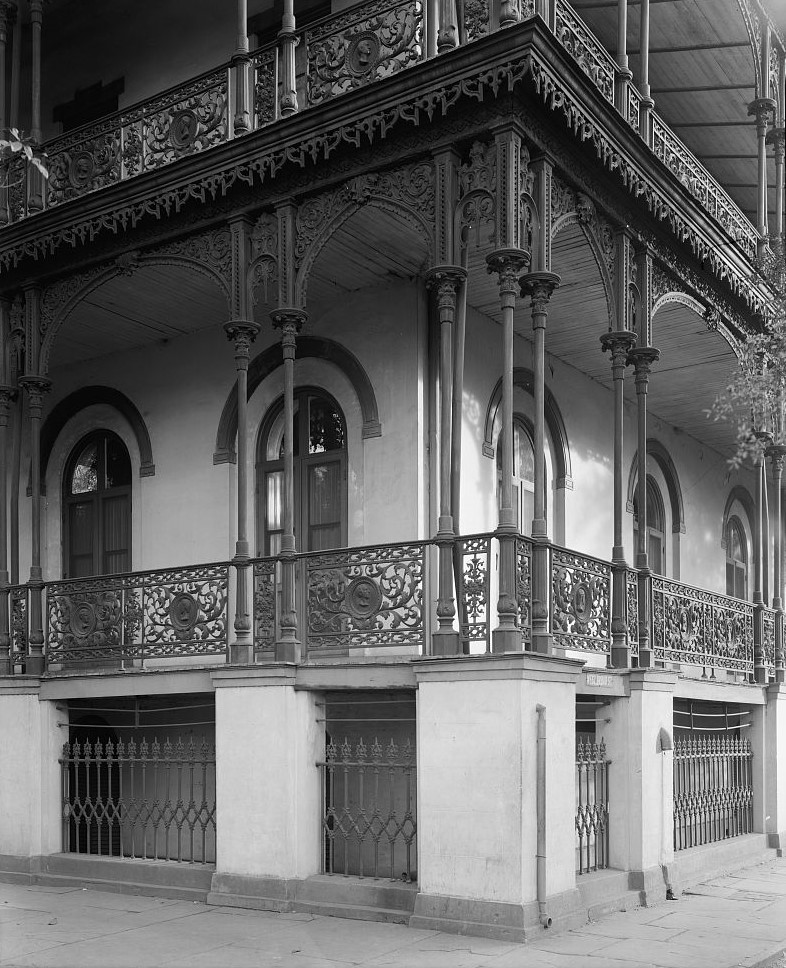

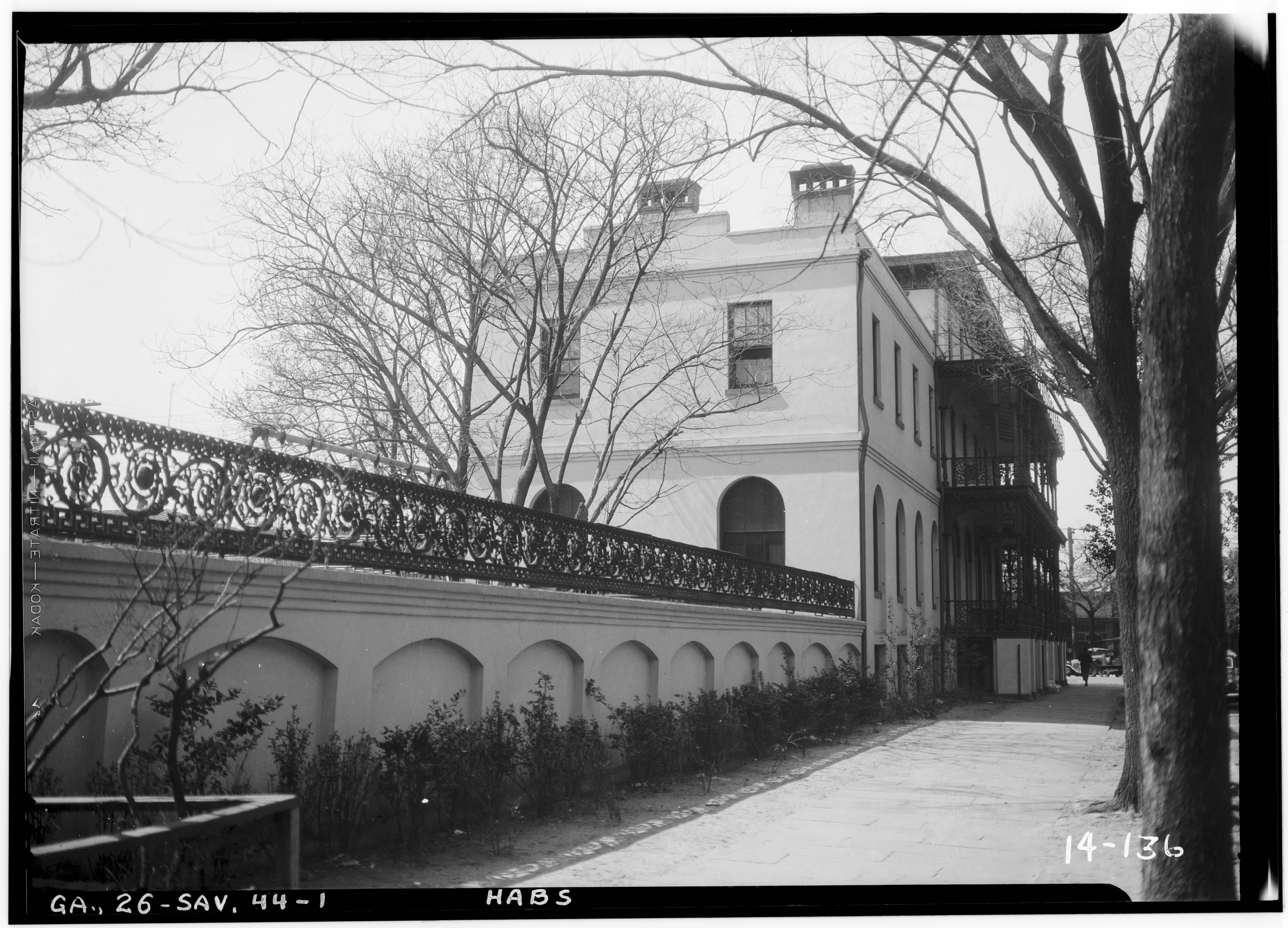
