= Blondelle Malone =

American artist (1877-1951)

- Born: November 16, 1877; Bostwick, Georgia
- Died: 1951 (aged 73–74); Columbia, South Carolina
- Known for: Painting
- Movement: American Impressionism

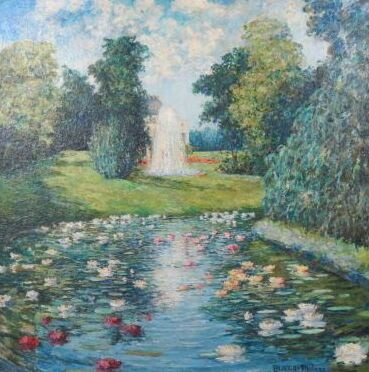
Garden with water lilies and fountain

Blondelle Octavia Edwards Malone (1877–1951) was an American artist known from her garden landscapes.

== Biography ==
Malone was born in Bostwick, Georgia on November 16, 1877. She was raised in Columbia, South Carolina She attended Converse College and then moved to New York City to study art, first at the New York School of Applied Design for Women, then at the New York School of Art. There she was taught by William Merritt Chase and John Henry Twachtman. She also studied with Robert Frederick Blum. Malone spent time at the Cos Cob art colony where she continued to study with Twachtman.

Malone traveled extensively. She visited Greece, Holland, Italy, Japan, and Yemen. She lived in France, England and Ireland. In Paris she lived at the American Girls' Club in Paris.

Malone died in 1951 in Columbia, South Carolina. Her papers are in the University of South Carolina.

In 1963 a selection her papers were assembled into a biography by Louise Jones DuBose entitled Enigma : the career of Blondelle Malone in art and society, 1879-1951, as told in her letters and diaries. Her work was included in the 2016 exhibition Scenic Impressions: Southern Interpretations from the Johnson Collection at the Morris Museum of Art. In 2020 her work was included in the traveling exhibition Central to Their Lives: Southern Women Artists in the Johnson Collection. In 2022 her work was included in the exhibition In the Shadow of Monet: Giverny and American Impressionism at the Columbia Museum of Art.
