= Edward Telfair =

American Founding Father and politician (1735–1807)

Governor of Georgia
- In office January 9, 1786 – January 9, 1787
- Preceded by: Samuel Elbert
- Succeeded by: George Mathews
- In office November 11, 1789 – November 7, 1793
- Preceded by: George Walton
- Succeeded by: George Mathews

Personal details
- Born: 1735 Scotland
- Died: September 17, 1807 (aged 71–72) Savannah, Georgia, U.S.
- Spouse: Sarah Gibbons (m. 1774)

Edward Telfair (1735 – September 17, 1807) was a Scottish-born American Founding Father, politician and slave trader who served as the governor of Georgia from 1786 to 1787 and again from 1790 to 1793. He was a member of the Continental Congress and one of the signers of the Articles of Confederation.

== Early life ==
Telfair was born in 1735 at Townhead, his family's farm near Kirkcudbright in Galloway, Scotland. He graduated from the Kirkcudbright Grammar School before acquiring commercial training. He immigrated to America in 1758 as an agent of a commission house, settling in Virginia. Telfair subsequently moved to Halifax, North Carolina, and finally to Savannah, Georgia, where he established his own commission house. He arrived in Georgia in 1766, joining his brother, William, who had emigrated earlier. Together with Basil Cowper, Telfair built the commission house, and it was an overnight success. Telfair married 16-year-old Sarah Gibbons in 1774 at her mother's Sharon Plantation just west of Savannah.

Telfair was an enslaver and a consultant on issues related to slavery. His mercantile firm dealt in enslaved people, among other things, and contemporary correspondence of his included discussions of such topics as the management of enslaved people, the purchase and sale of enslaved people, runaway slaves, the mortality rate of enslaved people born on plantations, the difficulty of selling closely related enslaved people, and the relations between whites and freedmen.

== Revolutionary period ==
Telfair was a member of a Committee of Safety (1775–1776) and was a delegate to the Georgia Provincial Congress meeting at Savannah in 1776. He was also a member of the Georgia Committee of Intelligence in 1776. Telfair was elected to the Continental Congress for 1778, 1780, 1781, and 1782. He was a signatory to the Articles of Confederation.

In 1783, during the Cherokee–American wars, Telfair was commissioned to treat with the Chickamauga Cherokee Indians. Telfair was the designated agent (on behalf of Georgia) in talks aimed at settling the northern boundary dispute with North Carolina in February 1783. The land in question was generally regarded as Creek land, so the Cherokees readily signed the treaty. The Creeks refused. Although the citizens of Franklin County begged him to retaliate, Secretary of War Henry Knox instructed Governor Telfair not to retaliate against the Creek Indians.

Telfair served three terms as governor of Georgia. During his second term as governor, he illegally granted thousands of acres of land to speculators as part of the Yazoo land scandal. Telfair was one of only 12 men who received electoral votes during the first election for President and Vice President of the United States, receiving the vote of one unrecorded elector from his home state of Georgia. Telfair was a candidate in the 1794 United States Senate election in Georgia, finishing a distant second to incumbent James Gunn.

== Death and legacy ==
Telfair died in Savannah in 1807, interred initially in the family vault at Sharon Plantation. Later in the 19th century, his remains were moved to Bonaventure Cemetery in Savannah. Three months after Telfair died, Georgia named Telfair County after the former governor. Later in the 19th century, Savannah's St. James Square was renamed Telfair Square to honor the family.

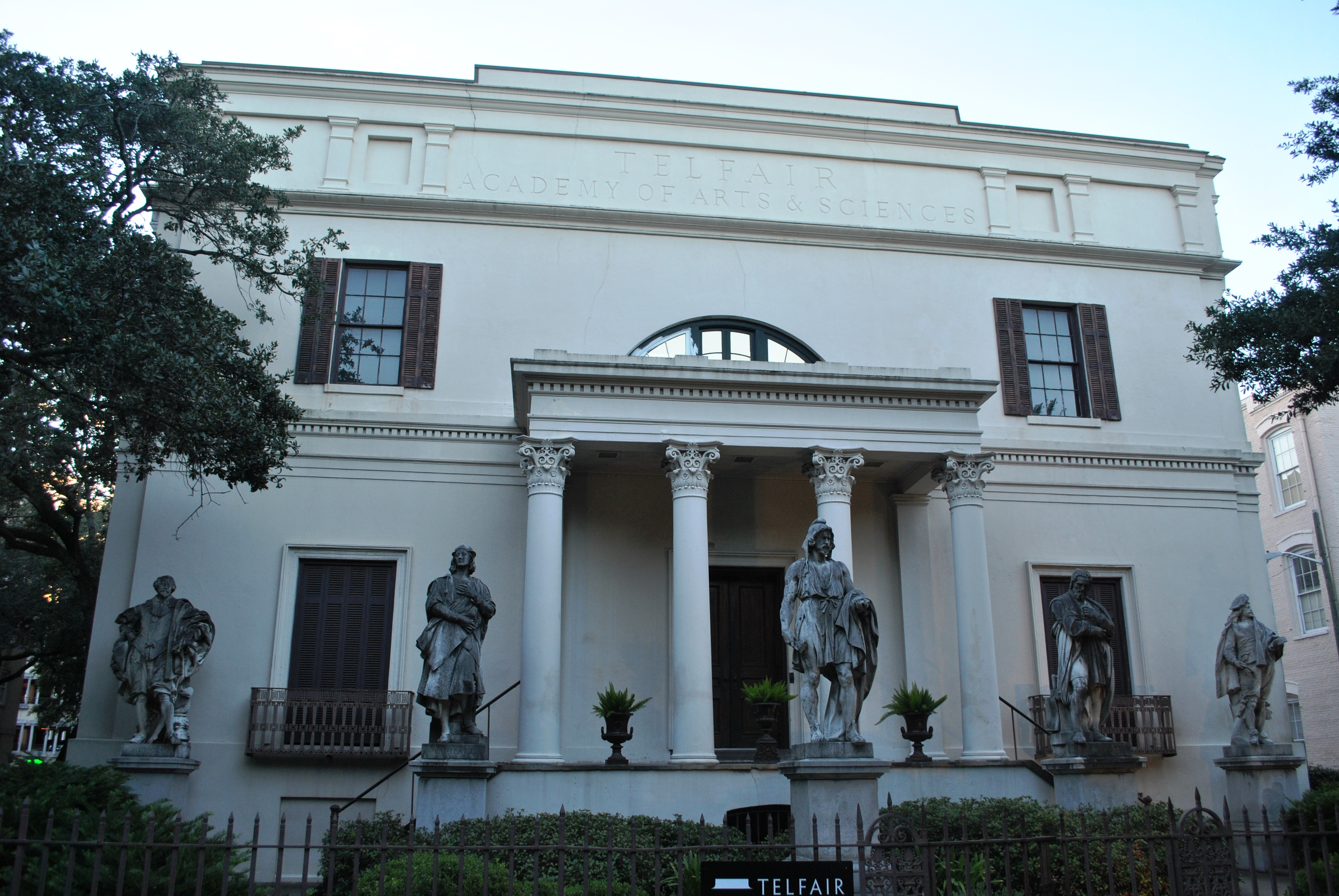
Telfair Academy, 1818, family mansion of Mary Telfair

One of Telfair's sons, Thomas Telfair, represented Georgia in the U.S. Congress. The eldest of the Telfair daughters, Mary Telfair, outlived her siblings and became the benefactor of the first public art museum in the American South, now a complex of three buildings called the Telfair Museums. After she died in 1875, her will also provided for the founding of the Telfair Hospital for Females. Today, it is known as Mary Telfair Women's Hospital.

== See also ==
- List of United States governors born outside the United States

Political offices
Preceded by Samuel Elbert	Governor of Georgia; 1786–1787	Succeeded by George Mathews
Preceded by George Walton	Governor of Georgia; 1789–1793	Succeeded by George Mathews
