= Candler Hospital (Savannah) =

- St. Joseph's/Candler Hospital
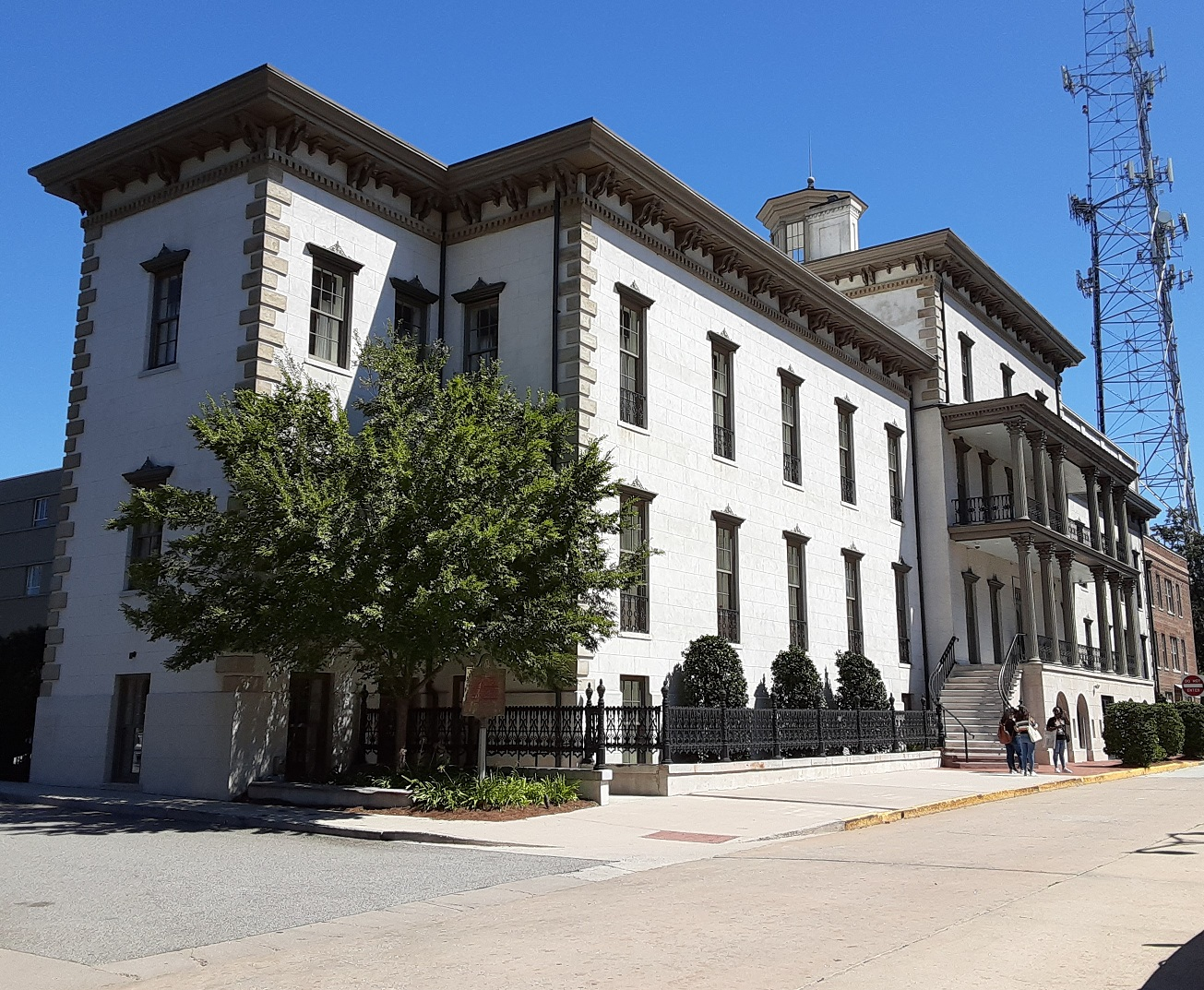
- The original Candler Hospital building is now owned by the Savannah College of Art and Design

Geography
- Location: 5353 Reynolds Street, Savannah, Georgia, United States
- Coordinates: 32.027365°N 81.099214°W

Services
- Beds: 384 licensed beds

History
- Founded: 1804

Links
- Website: www.sjchs.org
- Lists: Hospitals in Georgia

Candler Hospital is a historic 384-bed hospital currently located at 5353 Reynolds Street in Savannah, Georgia. It was originally founded in 1804 as a Seamen's Hospital and poor house and eventually became known as Savannah Hospital. It is the second oldest hospital in America in continuous operation. In 1931 the hospital was endowed by Coca-Cola founder Asa Griggs Candler and renamed after his brother Warren Akin Candler, who led the hospital to become affiliated with the Methodist Church. Candler Hospital later merged with St. Joseph's Hospital, another hospital also located in Savannah. The Candler campus is now home to the 62,000 sq ft Nancy N. and J.C Lewis Cancer & Research Pavilion, the region's National Cancer Institute selected cancer center, a national destination for cancer care. Candler Hospital also houses a Level II NICU, and the Mary Telfair Women's Hospital which offers specialized care for women.

It is included in Savannah Historic District.

== See also ==
- List of the oldest hospitals in the United States
- List of hospitals in Georgia (U.S. state)
- Buildings in Savannah Historic District
