= Myrtle Jones =

American painter

- Born: January 23, 1913; Winder, Georgia
- Died: February 15, 2005 (aged 92)
- Education: Telfair Academy of Arts and Sciences
- Occupation: Artist

Myrtle Jones (January 23, 1913 – February 15, 2005) was an artist whose paintings commonly featured streetscapes and architecture of Savannah, Georgia, as well as portraits.

Jones was born in Winder, Forsyth County, Georgia and moved to Savannah in 1943. A professional hairdresser, Jones formally took up painting in 1950 when she studied at the Telfair Academy of Arts and Sciences under Emil Holzhauer (among others). Despite this training she has been identified as a self-taught artist, and considered herself to be self-taught. In 1964 she purchased a house on Gaston Street in Savannah's historic district and used it as her home and studio through the remainder of her career.

Jones' work is considered distinct for its balance of modern and representational approaches. During the 1950s and early 1960s, she utilized strong colors, brushstrokes and lines in her portraits, which Jones referred to as her "dark and bold period". Her later works gravitated towards light colors to create a "faded" effect. Throughout her career Jones depicted everyday life in Savannah, through subjects including urban streetscapes, buildings, landscapes, and portraits of locals. Jones was a prolific painter, possibly creating thousands of works within her lifetime. She posthumously donated some of her paintings to the Telfair Museum of Art along with a one million dollar endowment.

== Selected exhibitions ==
- Women Artists in Savannah. Telfair Academy, March 13, 2015
- Exposed! Telfair Women Artists & Patrons. Telfair Museum of Art, March 12 – April 21, 1996
- Looking Back: Art in Savannah 1900-1960. Telfair Museum of Art, July 16 – September 15, 1996
