= Sharon Plantation =

Former plantation in Savannah, Georgia

- Interactive map of the Sharon Plantation area

General information
- Location: Old Louisville Road, Colonial Savannah, Province of Georgia
- Coordinates: 32.0921°N 81.2177°W

Sharon Plantation was a plantation originally founded in colonial Savannah, Province of Georgia. It covered around 200 acres (81 ha), on land bounded by Old Louisville Road and the Ogeechee Canal 6 miles (9.7 km) to the west of the city.

The plantation came into the Telfair family via Barach Gibbons, son of William Gibbons and the brother-in-law of Edward Telfair. Barach died in 1814 and bequeathed the plantation to his sister, Sarah. Edward married Sarah at the plantation in 1774. One of their children, born in 1791, was philanthropist Mary Telfair. She was their first daughter of eight children.

In 1782, during the Revolutionary War, Emistisiguo, chief of the local Upper Creek Indian tribe, attacked Anthony Wayne's camp at the plantation in the early hours of June 24. Wayne had arrived with the intention of disbanding the British alliance with Indian tribes in Georgia. He negotiated peace treaties with both the Creeks and the Cherokees, for which Georgia rewarded him with a large rice plantation.

On October 15, 1785, Dr. Samuel Vickers, Surgeon of the Hospitals during the Revolutionary War, committed suicide at the plantation. The coroner found "he had been for some time before insane and not of sound memory and perfect understanding".

In 1859, Augustus Wetter purchased the plantation.

Around Christmas 1862, the body of a Mrs. Haig, a relative of his wife, was stolen from its vault at the Sharon Plantation. The vault had been forced open, and the body (along with a silver plate that had been resting atop the coffin) was missing. Wetter offered a large reward in the Savannah Morning News for information on the theft.

Wetter was buried at the plantation after his death in 1882.

Edward Telfair was initially interred in a vault at the plantation after his death in 1807, but his remains were moved to Bonaventure Cemetery later in the 19th century. It is believed Wetter's family is still buried at the site, despite the plantation's sale by the descendants of Wetter.
