= American Girls' Club in Paris =

Boarding house for American women in Paris

Coordinates: 48.8419°N 2.3317°E

The American Girls' Club in Paris was a boarding house for young American women aged eighteen to forty located at 4 Rue de Chevreuse in the 6th arrondissement of Paris, France. The club was founded in September 1893 by the American Elisabeth Mills Reid (wife of Whitelaw Reid, the former United States Ambassador to France) and Mrs. Helen Pert Newell (wife of Reverend William Whiting Newell II, pastor of St. Lukes Chapel, Paris).https://timesmachine.nytimes.com/timesmachine/1894/01/26/104106007.html?pageNumber=3 Its purpose was to provide "place for meeting and for sociablllty for those who by reason of their unfamiliarity with the language and the people of the country must otherwise be lonely and be handicapped, by their ignorance.".

Young women paid $30 per month for room and board. The club served tea at 4pm and taught evening lessons in French for one franc per day. It included libraries and an independent studio, although did not include enough space for a full bath. Students often studied at the Académie Julian and Académie de la Grande Chaumière art schools. The club closed with the onset of World War I and was converted to an American Red Cross hospital. The building is now owned by Columbia University as Reid Hall.

== Residents ==
- Birgitta Moran Farmer
- Anne Goldthwaite
- Blondelle Malone
- Mary Rogers Williams
- Emma Cheves Wilkins

== See also ==
- The Club, 2025 book by Jennifer Dasal about the Girls' Club
