= Mary Rogers Williams =

American painter

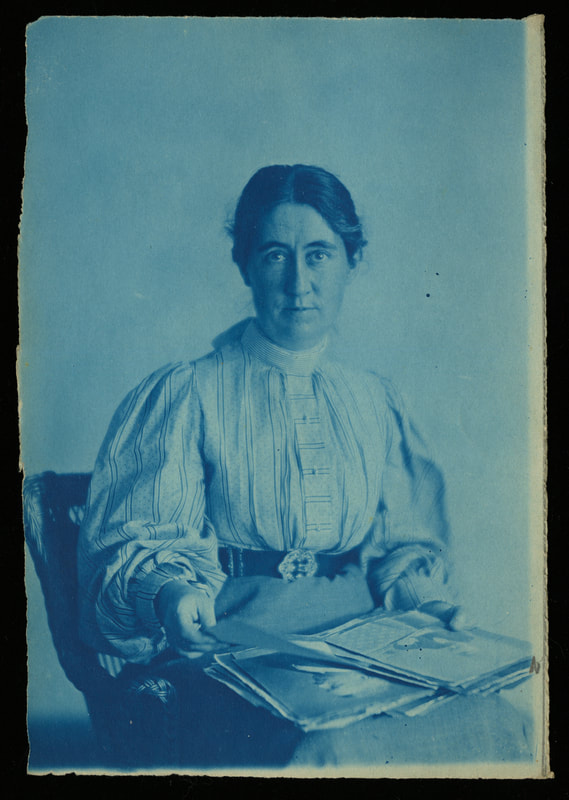
Cyanotype portrait of Mary Rogers Williams

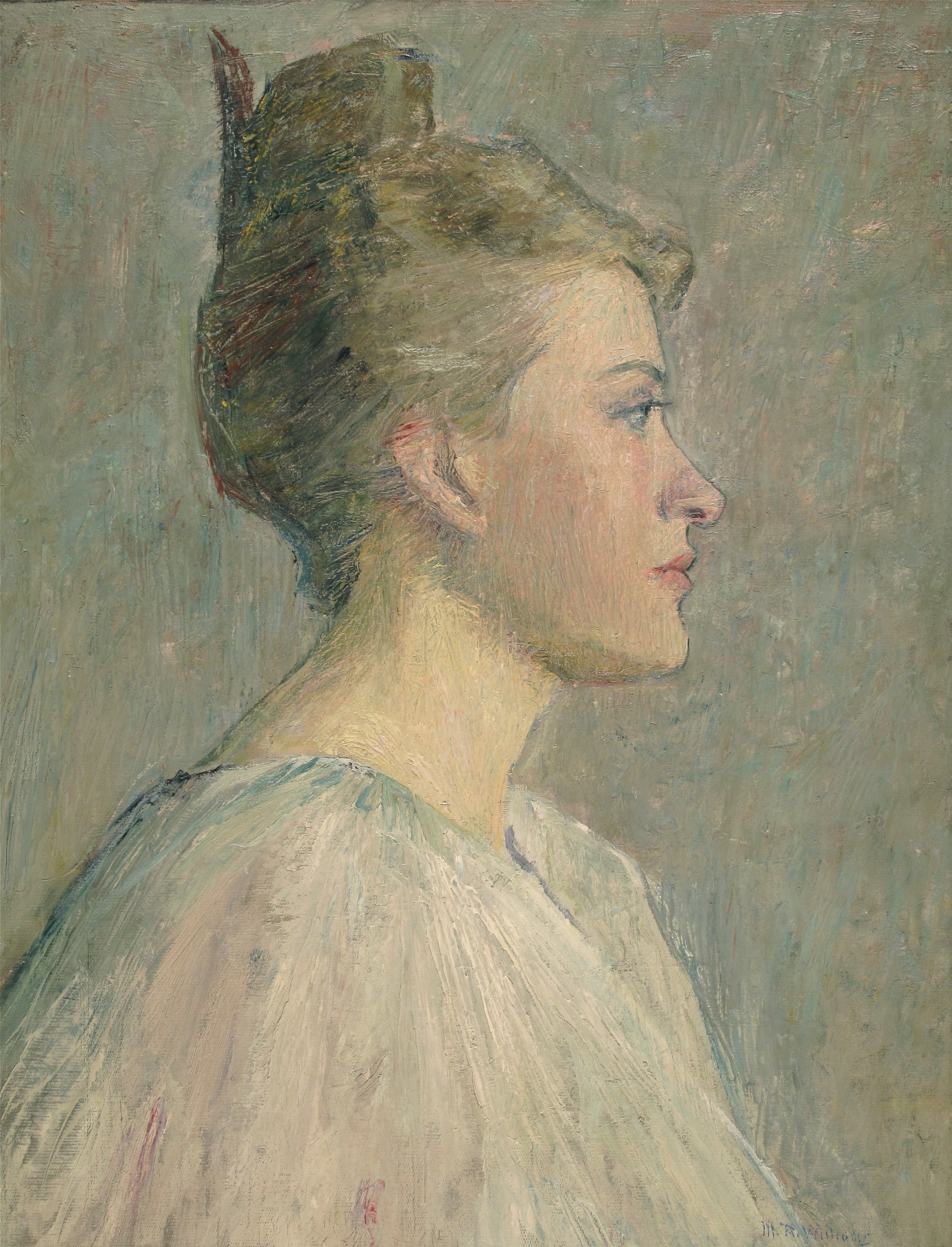
A Profile, c. 1895, oil on canvas, by Mary Rogers Williams

Mary Rogers Williams (September 30, 1857 – September 17, 1907) was an American tonalist and Impressionist artist known for pastel and oil portraits and landscapes. She was second in command of Smith College's art department from 1888 to 1906 under Dwight William Tryon and earned acclaim for paintings of her native New England and scenes from her wide travels in Europe, from Norway to the Paestum ruins south of Naples. She often depicted high horizons, whether in meadows or medieval hill towns, under ribbons of sky.

== Biography ==
Mary Rogers Williams was born and raised in Hartford, Connecticut, the fifth of six children of Edward Williams (1822–1871), a prosperous baker, and Mary Ann French Williams (1824–1861). Mary and her surviving sisters Lucy, Abby and Laura were all star students at Hartford Public High School, and none ever married. Mary Rogers Williams's early mentor was James Wells Champney, and she studied at the Art Students League with William Merritt Chase and at Hartford's Decorative Art Society before taking the Smith post. (A Hartford neighbor and family friend, Lindley Williams Hubbell, became a renowned poet.) Her classes at Smith included drawing, painting, sculpture, art history, "study of design with practical work" and "artistic anatomy", and she wrote a catalog of the college's plaster cast sculpture collection. She occasionally visited New York, stopping by the studio of her friend Albert Pinkham Ryder.

Almost every summer, she traveled in Europe, attracting crowds in villages when she sketched the scenery and locals. She sometimes walked between towns, partly because she could not afford car or carriage fees, and would set off to "catch a sketch" or "find a sketch," as she wrote to her sisters. Although she was Episcopalian, she attended Catholic church services in Europe (sometimes numerous times in a row on Sundays) and wrote lavish descriptions of the costumes and music to her sisters. She had a Hartford-made bicycle shipped overseas for traveling in the countryside. She lived in Paris in 1898–99 (she studied then at the Ecole des Beaux-Arts and with James Abbott McNeill Whistler) and 1906–07, in flats on rue Boissonade, with numerous other painters nearby.

== Artistic achievements ==
A member of the New York Woman’s Art Club, she exhibited there (1899, 1902, 1903) and at venues including the American Water Color Society (1892), Art Association of Indianapolis (1895), Pennsylvania Academy of the Fine Arts (1895, 1896, 1902–04), Gill's Art Galleries, Springfield, Massachusetts (1898), American Girl's Club in Paris (1898, 1907), National Academy of Design (1903–04), New York Water Color Club (1892–96, 1899–1902), Society of American Artists (1896), Macbeth Gallery (1902, 1903—she also commissioned "aquarium"-like frames from Macbeth, with a glass layer an inch away from the delicate pastel surface) and Paris Salon (1899). Commemorative posthumous shows were held in 1908 and 1909 at the Philadelphia Water Color Club (at Pennsylvania Academy), New York Water Color Club and Wadsworth Atheneum and Hartford Art Society in Hartford. Publications that praised her include the New York Times, the Hartford Courant, the Springfield Republican and various art magazines. In 1894, in an article in the Quarterly Illustrator (vol. 2, no. 6, p. 111-124), the novelist Elizabeth Williams Champney described Mary Williams as "an artist with rare poetic instinct and feeling" and "a woman of conscience as well as feeling, and of a fine scorn for all shams." The Champney article added, "When asked what style she proposed to adopt, she replied: 'If I cannot have a style of my own, I trust I may be spared an adopted one.'"

== Death ==
Williams died a few days after she was diagnosed with abdominal tumors in Florence and is buried in the Allori cemetery there (there is also a marker for her with her siblings' and parents' graves in Spring Grove Cemetery in Hartford). Family and friends kept her paintings inventory together, and most remain in a private New England collection. Institutions that have her work include the Smith College Museum of Art, Connecticut Landmarks and the Connecticut Historical Society—the latter both own Williams' portraits of her friend and patron, the New Haven antiquarian George Dudley Seymour.

== Papers ==
Williams' diary, photos of her and thousands of pages of her correspondence are in a private New England collection. A few letters about and from her are in the Macbeth Gallery papers at the Smithsonian's Archives of American Art and the George Dudley Seymour papers at Yale and at the Connecticut Historical Society.

== Note on references ==
Virtually all biographical information for Mary Rogers Williams (1857–1907) comes from her archive in a private New England collection, a promised gift to Smith College, which contains diary entries, sketches, letters and clippings and other ephemera including concert programs and confetti from Paris parades. She wrote home from her frequent trips in Europe almost every day, delving into topics including her works in progress, passing scenery, treatment of women travelers, and her criticisms of ancient building restorations and of art and recent art restorations in European museums and gallery shows. The handwritten material confirms, corrects and fleshes out information published about her in publications including Art Amateur, the Macbeth Gallery's Art Notes, Boston Journal, Brooklyn Daily Eagle, Buffalo Evening News, The Critic, Hartford Courant, New York Evening Post, New York Herald, New York Press, New York Sun, New York Times, New York Tribune, Smith College alumnae publications, and the Springfield Republican. An exhibition of her work with biographical material published ran from Oct. 2014 to Jan. 2015 at the Florence Griswold Museum in Old Lyme, Connecticut. A biography of her has been written by the journalist Eve M. Kahn for Wesleyan University Press.
