= Telfair Academy =

Historic house museum in Savannah, Georgia, US

- U.S. National Register of Historic Places
- U.S. National Historic Landmark
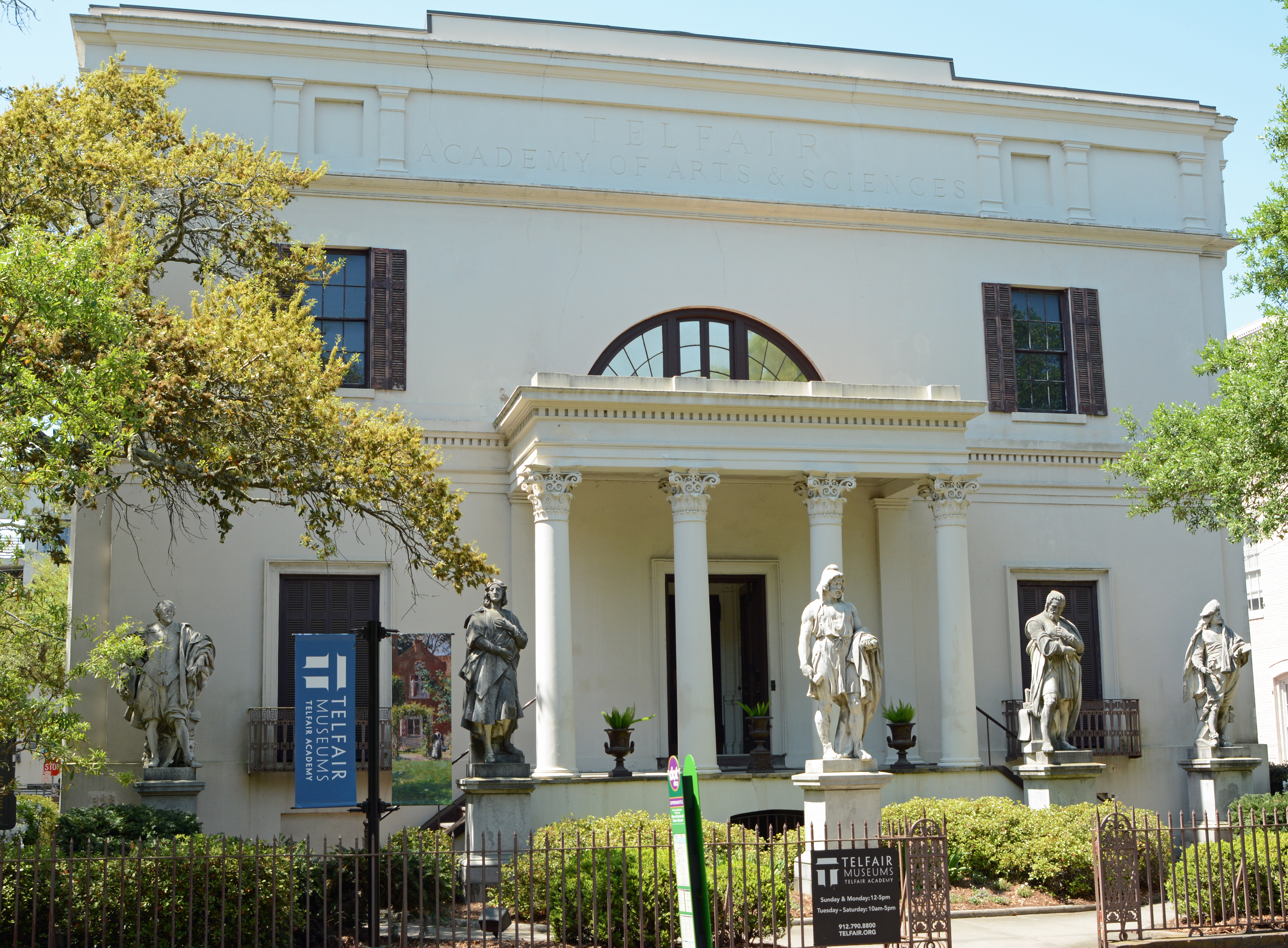
- Telfair Academy in 2015

- Location within Georgia Location within the United States
- Location: 121 Barnard St., Savannah, Georgia
- Coordinates: 32°04′44″N 81°05′43″W
- Built: 1818
- Architect: Jay, William; Brandt, Carl N.
- Architectural style: English Regency
- Part of: Savannah Historic District (ID66000277)
- NRHP reference No.: 76000612

Significant dates
- Added to NRHP: May 11, 1976
- Designated NHL: May 11, 1976

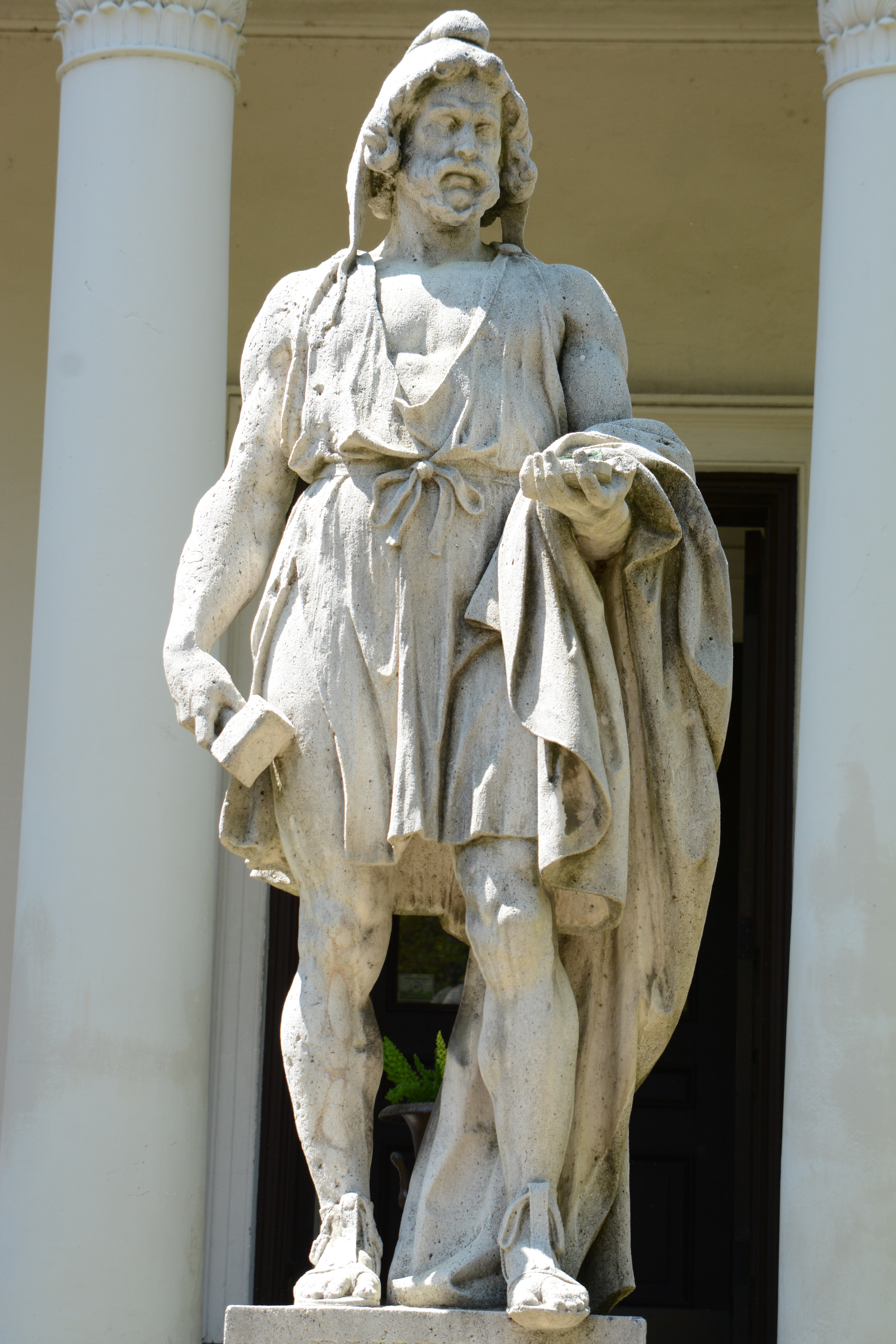
Statue of Phidias

The Telfair Academy is a historic mansion at 121 Barnard Street in Savannah, Georgia. It was designed by William Jay and built in 1818, and is one of a small number of Jay's surviving works. It is one of three sites owned by Telfair Museums. Originally a family townhouse belonging to the Telfair family, it became a free art museum in 1886, and thus one of the first 10 art museums in America, and the oldest public art museum in the South. Its first director, elected in 1883, was artist Carl Ludwig Brandt, who spent winters in Savannah. It was declared a National Historic Landmark in 1976.

== Architecture and history ==
Telfair Academy is located in historic central Savannah, on the west side of Telfair Square. It occupies an entire block, bounded by Barnard, West President, North Jefferson, and West State Streets. It is a two-story masonry structure, built out of brick finished in stucco. Its entrance is a form typical of architect William Jay, with a projecting four-column portico that is accessed via side-facing stairs. The columns are of a composite order, and the portico's entablature is continued around the building as a stringcourse. Unlike the symmetrical exterior, the interior of the house is asymmetrical, its unusually shaped rooms including an octagonal drawing room, round-ended dining room, and long drawing room with rounded ends. The building's west wing is its former carriage house, which was adapted in the 1880s as part of the building's conversion to a museum, and has fine Adam style woodwork.

The house was designed by William Jay and built in 1818 for Alexander Telfair, son of Edward Telfair, one of Georgia's early post-independence governors. The site on which it was built previously housed the official residence of Georgia's colonial royal governors. In 1875 Alexander's sister, Mary, bequeathed the house, including its furnishings and family collections, to the Georgia Historical Society, which opened the first art museum in the southeastern United States here in 1886. The house was remodeled and expanded to be a museum by architect Detlef Lienau.

== Collection ==
Telfair Academy features furnished period rooms that highlight the museum's collection of decorative arts and many family furnishings including beautiful 19th and 20th century American and European paintings and sculptures. In front of the building are statues of Rembrandt, Rubens, Phidias, Raphael, and Michelangelo (see the link to Commons below).

=== Savannah artists ===
In addition to these works from notable European and American artists, Telfair Academy houses fine and decorative artworks representing Savannah's history and from native Savannah artists.

- Myrtle Jones - self-taught streetscape and portrait painter; studied briefly at the Telfair Academy of Arts and Sciences under Emil Holzhauer and others.
- Frederick Marquand- silversmith and President of Marquand and Co.; worked in Savannah, and moved to Southport, Connecticut where he was instrumental in the founding of noted special collections institution Pequot Library.

=== See also ===
- Bird Girl
- List of National Historic Landmarks in Georgia (U.S. state)
- National Register of Historic Places listings in Chatham County, Georgia

== Photos ==
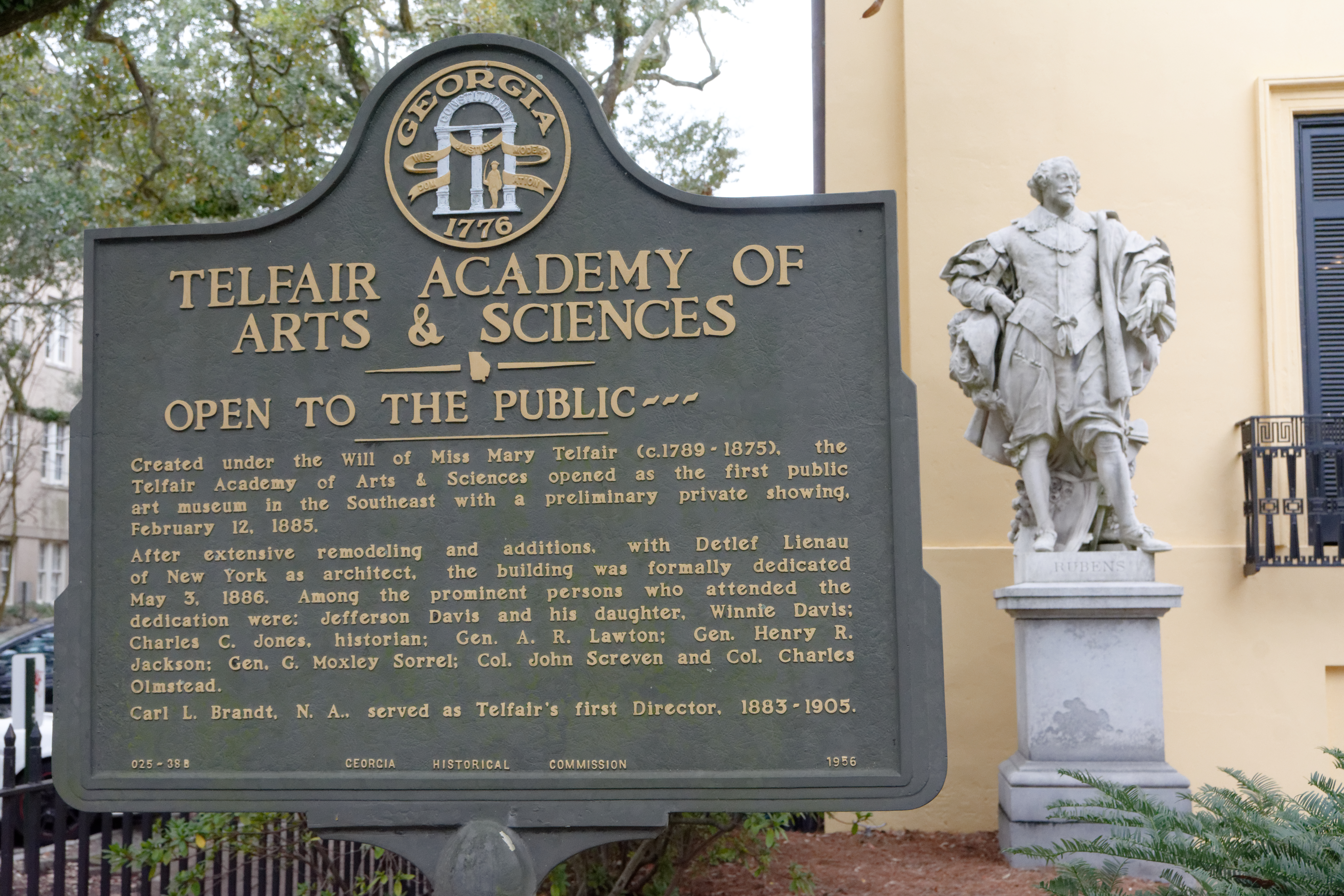
historical marker

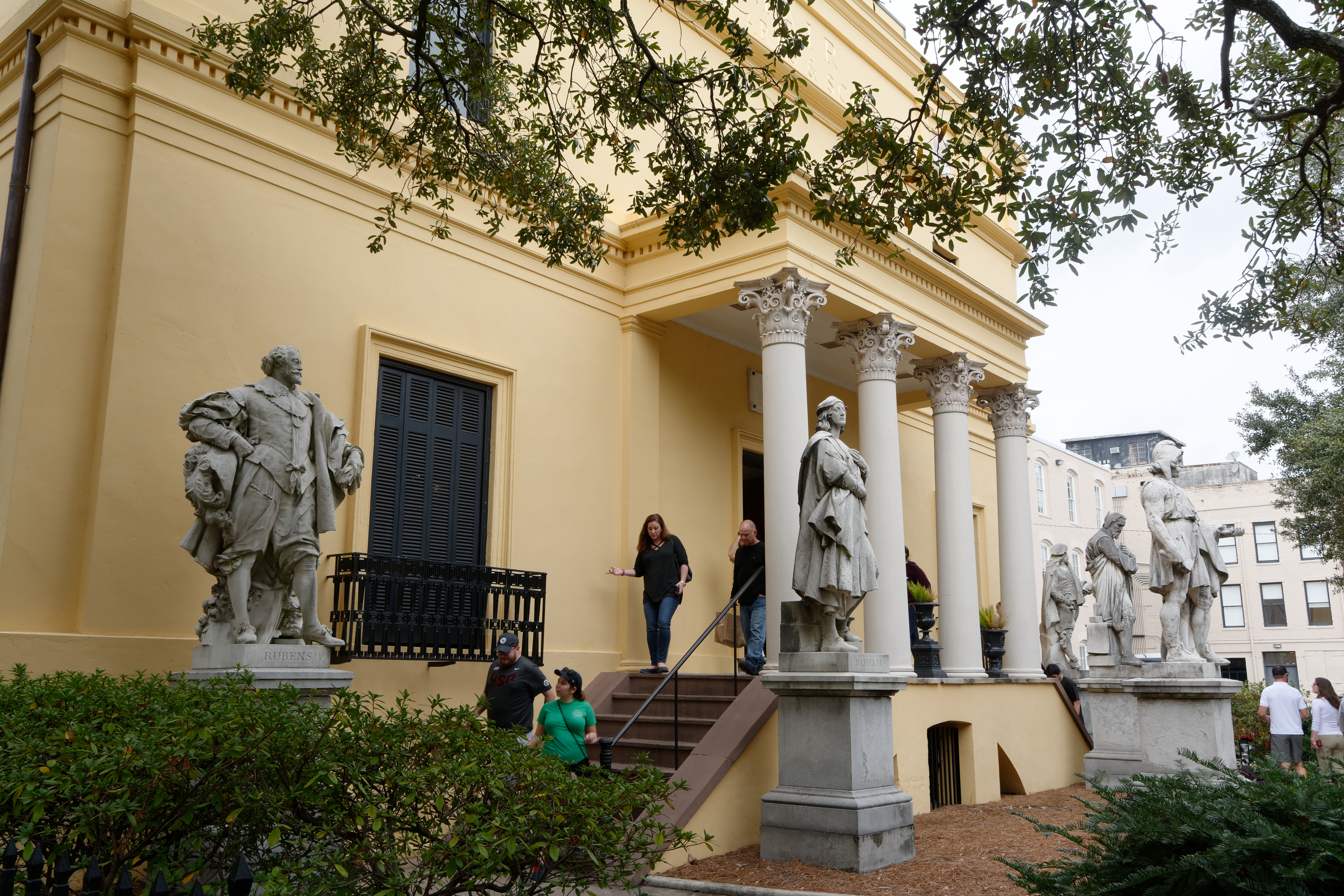
Telfair Academy in 2018

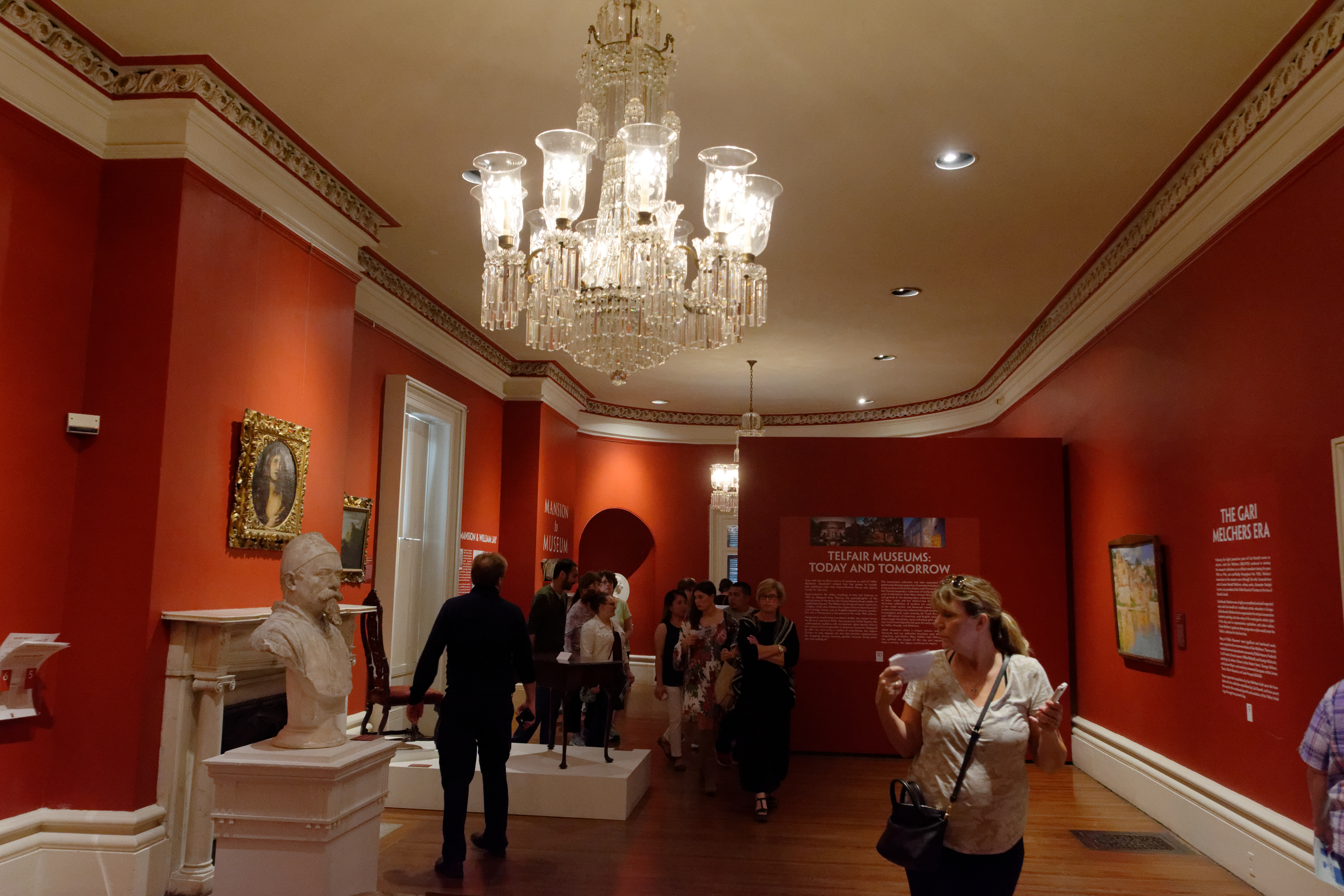
Room in the original house part of Telfair Academy

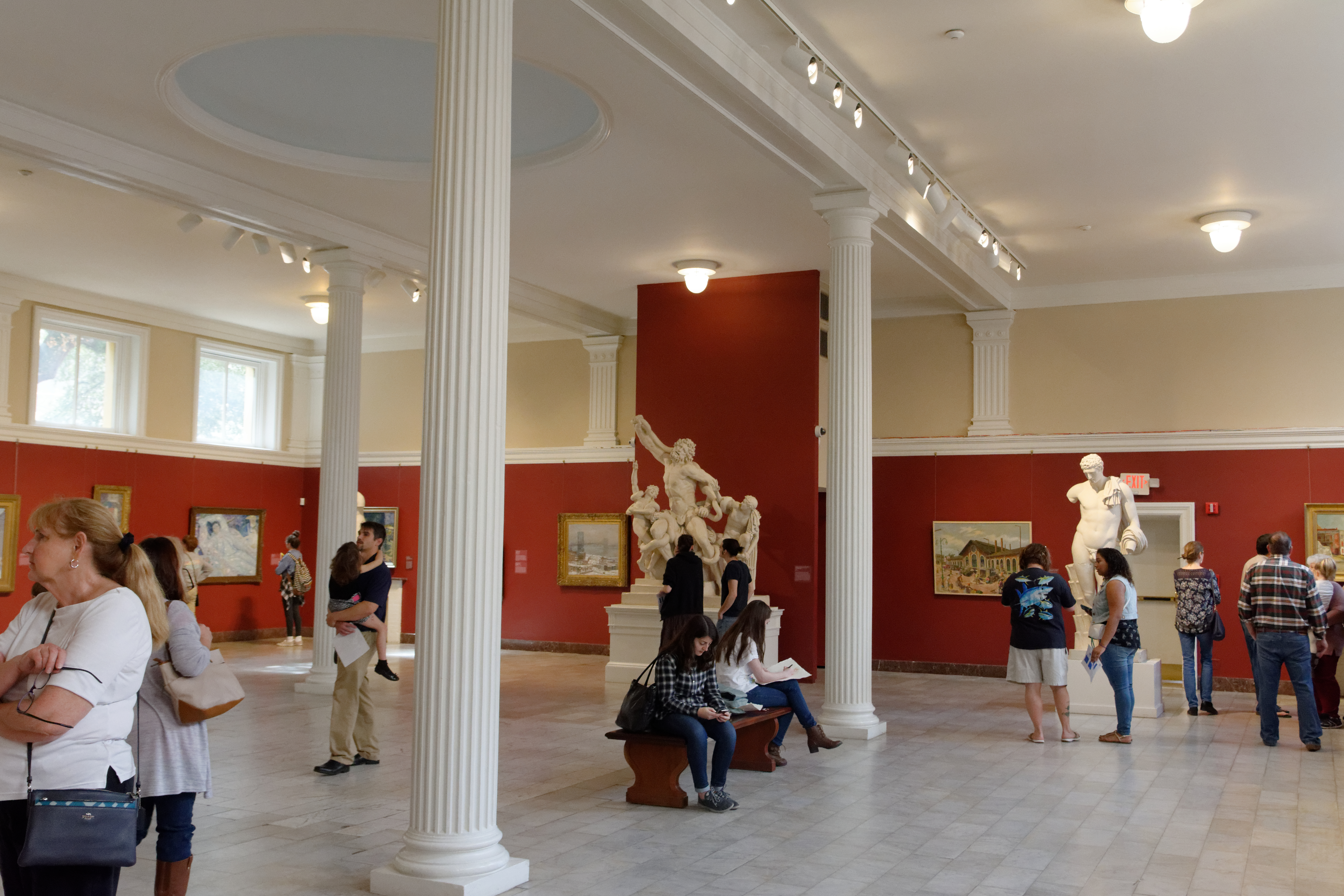
Inside Telfair Academy

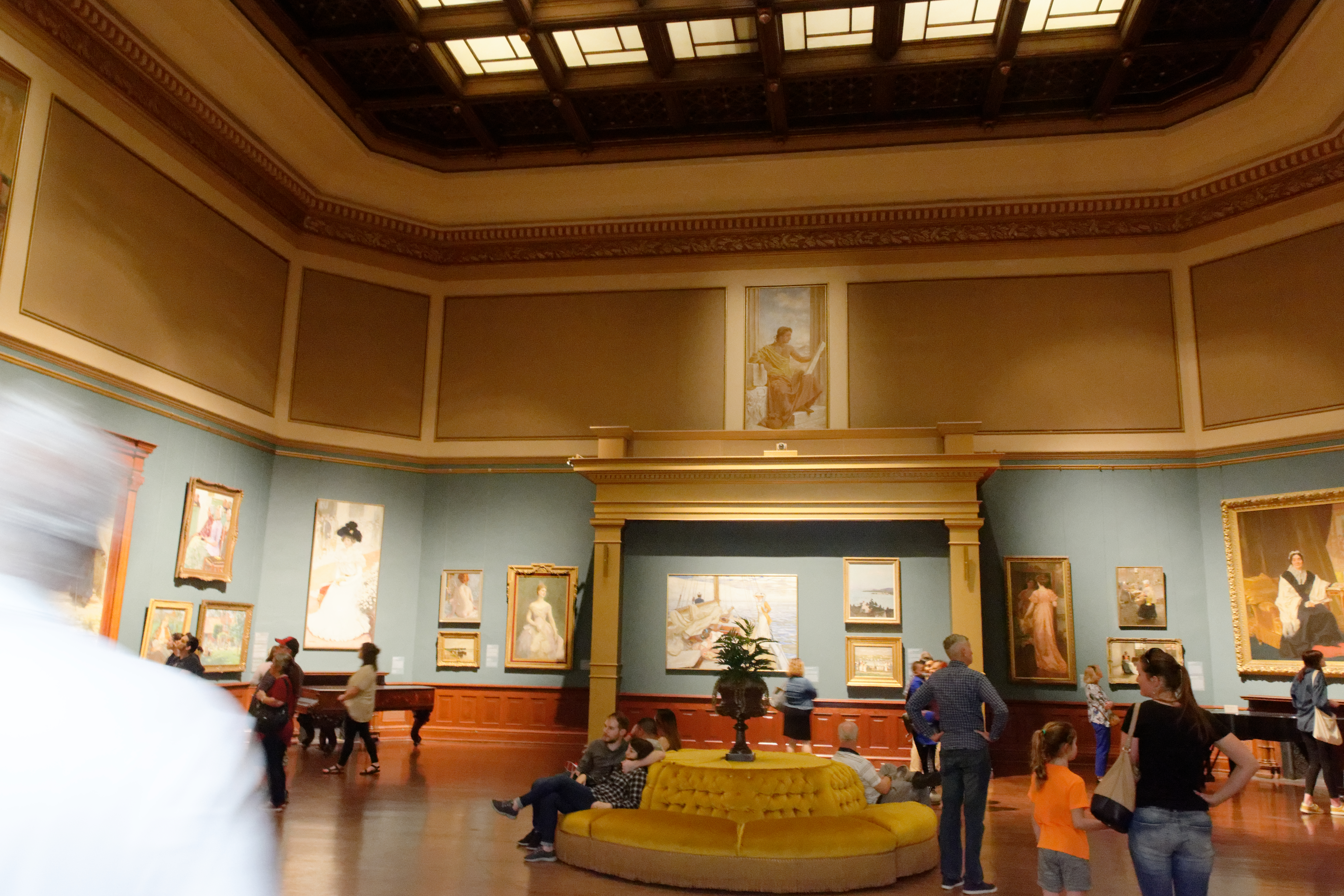
Inside Telfair Academy
