= Karl Brandt (disambiguation) =

Karl Brandt (1904–1948) was the co-director of the Action T4 euthanasia program in Nazi Germany and the personal physician of Adolf Hitler.

Karl Brandt may also refer to:

- Karl Brandt (economist) (1899–1975), German-American agricultural economist
- Karl Brandt (zoologist) (1854–1931), German zoologist and marine biologist
- Karl-Wilhelm Brandt (1869–1923), also known as Vassily Brandt, Russian trumpeter, pedagogue, and composer

== See also ==
- Carl Brandt (disambiguation)
