= Birgitta Moran Farmer =

American painter

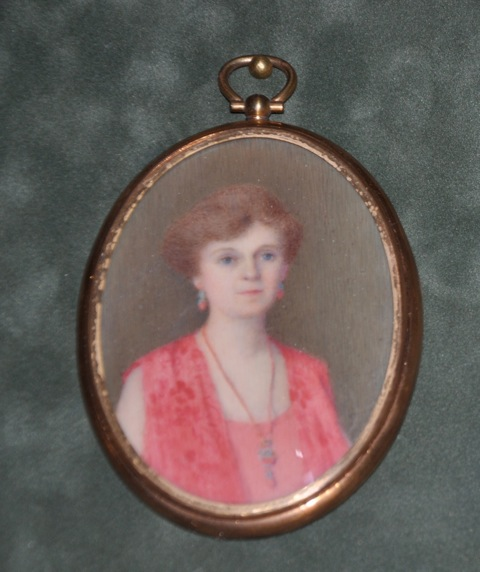
- "Self Portrait". 1924. Watercolor on Ivory
- Born: Birgitta Kathleen Moran; May 23, 1881; Lyons, New York, U.S.
- Died: January 17, 1939 (aged 57); Syracuse, New York, U.S.
- Spouse(s): Dr. Patrick Farmer, 1913
- Children: 4

Birgitta Kathleen Moran Farmer (May 23, 1881 – January 17, 1939) was an American artist particularly known for her portrait miniatures.

== Life ==
Birgitta Moran was born in Lyons, New York. She attended Lyons Public School and graduated from the Convent of the Sacred Heart in Rochester, New York. A graduate of the College of Fine Arts of Syracuse University and a member of Gamma Phi Beta's Alpha Chapter, she won the 1906 Hiram Gee Award in Painting at commencement.

She used the award to study at Académie Julian and Académie de la Grande Chaumière Paris during 1906–1907. Among other places, she roomed at the American Girls' Club in Paris.

She married Dr. Thomas Patrick Farmer of Syracuse, New York in 1913. They had four children. She exhibited with the Brooklyn Society of Miniature Painters, American Society of Miniature Painters, the Pennsylvania Society of Miniature Painters, the National Association of Women Painters and Sculptors, and the Associated Artists of Syracuse. She died in 1939 in Syracuse, New York, of cancer, aged 57.

== Art ==
Farmer's work, including her 1924 self-portrait, was exhibited at the 24th and 25th Annual Exhibition of American Society of Miniature Painters and the Pennsylvania Society of Miniature Painters's 38th Annual Exhibition.

Her portraits of Briget Amelia Moran (nee Fitzpatrick) titled "Mother" and of Anna V. Dunn titled "Mrs. Hugh Edward McSloy" were exhibited at the 1921 Annual Water Colors and Miniature Exhibitions of The Pennsylvania Academy of the Fine Arts.

Her portrait of her daughter "Anne" was included in the 1933 Chicago World's Fair Century of Progress "Exhibition of Miniature Paintings by Living Artists", The Metropolitan Museum of Art "Four Centuries of Miniature Painting", and the Smithsonian American Art Museum National Collection of Fine Arts.

Farmer is included in the National Portrait Gallery (United States) Catalog of American Portraits, the National Portrait Gallery Library and the Archives of American Art.

Her art was often signed “B K Moran”, “Moran”, or “B M Farmer”.
