= Reid Hall =

Academic complex in Paris, France

Coordinates: 48.8419°N 2.3317°E

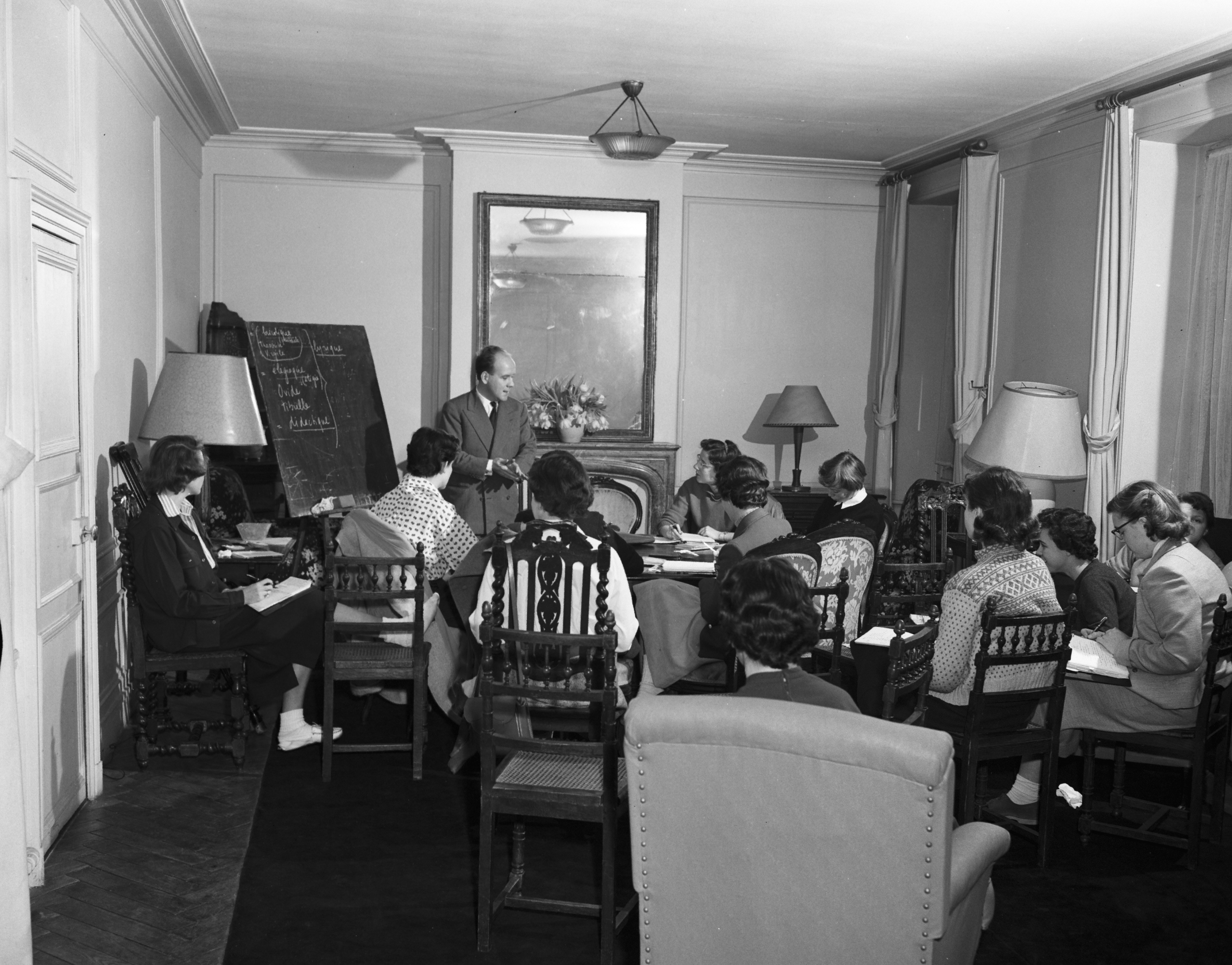
Reid Hall

Reid Hall is a complex of academic facilities owned and operated by Columbia University that is located in the Montparnasse quartier of Paris, France. It houses the Columbia University Institute for Scholars in addition to various graduate and undergraduate divisions of over a dozen Anglophone colleges and universities. For over a century, Reid Hall has served as a link between the academic communities of the United States and France.

== Overview ==
In 1964, the property was bequeathed to Columbia University, and has since seen lectures by such notable French intellectuals as structuralist critic Roland Barthes, deconstructionalist philosopher Jacques Derrida, existentialist philosopher Simone de Beauvoir, cinema critic Michel Ciment, and Edwy Plenel, former editor-in-chief of Le Monde. In addition to Columbia University, it currently houses undergraduate and graduate divisions of more than 12 institutions, including:

- American Graduate School in Paris
- Barnard College
- City University of New York
- Dartmouth College
- Hamilton College
- Sarah Lawrence College
- Smith College
- Tulane University
- The University of Delaware
- University of Florida
- Vassar College
- Wesleyan University
- University of Kent Paris School of Arts and Culture

As well as other intercollegial programs.

== History ==
=== Porcelain factory ===
Reid Hall's origins date to the mid-eighteenth century, when it served as a porcelain factory and warehouse. By 1799, the building was purchased by two French brothers by the name of Dagoty, who succeeded in converting the building to one of the largest and most successful porcelain factories in France. By 1812, the Dagoty brothers had over a hundred workers in their employ and built an additional three warehouses and four storerooms, one of which was richly ornamented with mirrors and decorative shelves. Their porcelain was not only popular in the dining rooms of the local bourgeoisie, but was also purchased for such residences as the castle of Compiègne, the palace of Versailles, and the White House in Washington, D.C. James Monroe, who was then the President of the United States, commissioned a Dagoty china service featuring an American eagle motif for use at official state dinners.

=== Keller Institute ===
In 1834, the site became the home of the Keller Institute, a boarding school led by a Swiss Protestant Educator Jean-Jacques Keller. It was the first Protestant school established in France since the revocation of the Edict of Nantes in 1685, whose student body came from the home of bourgeois Huguenots, or French Protestants, and wealthy expatriates. Students included André Gide, who attended the Institute in 1886, an experience that he later described in his writings.

=== Elizabeth Mills Reid ===
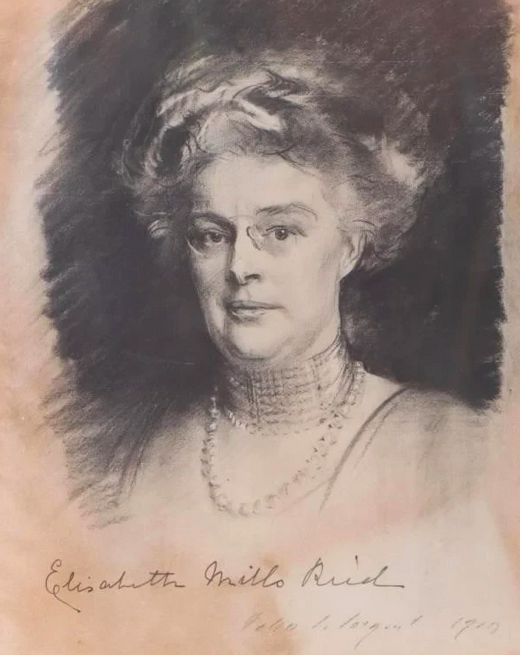
Elizabeth Mills Reid

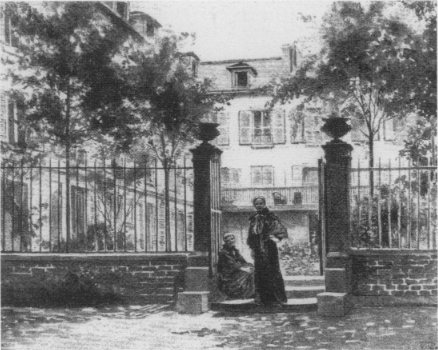
American Girl's Club around 1894.

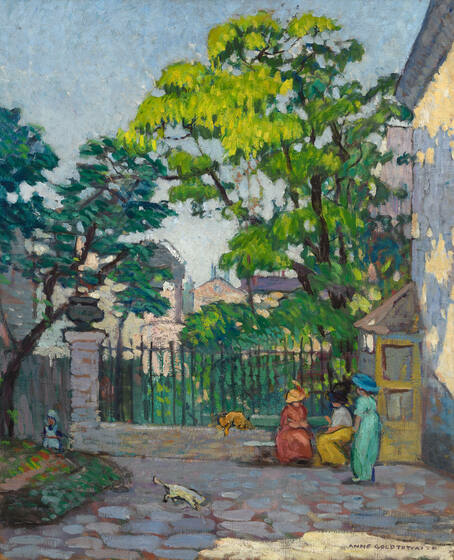
Gate in 1908, by Anne Goldthwaite

By 1893, The Keller Institute was forced to close its doors, and the complex was purchased by the philanthropist and social activist Elizabeth Mills Reid, whose father, Darius O. Mills, had been president of the Bank of California, and whose husband was the American plenipotentiary minister to Paris, Whitelaw Reid. Mrs. Reid then established the American Girls' Club in Paris in hopes of providing artistic and academic opportunities to young American women living in Paris. The success of the club allowed Reid to expand the complex to include a neighboring building and its courtyard.

=== World War I hospital ===
At the outbreak of World War I, the property was converted into a hospital, and its classrooms were used to house wounded soldiers. The complex saw a number of new buildings constructed at this time to provide more adequated facilities for the enormous number of casualties being cared for by the American Red Cross. After the war's end, the site remained in the hands of the American Red Cross until 1922.

=== Academic rebirth ===
In 1922, Reid began converting the complex to house a center for advanced and university studies for American women. Reid Hall became important to American women's academics in Western Europe, and grew along with Franco-American artistic activity in the Montparnasse quarter during the inter-war period, with visits and lectures being provided by influential neighbors including Gertrude Stein and Nadia Boulanger. During World War II, Reid Hall became a refuge, first for Polish university women, then for Belgian teachers, and later for the women students of the Ecole Normale Superieure de Sèvres. After the war, the property was converted once again to a university center, this time with a coeducational student body. The Sweet Briar College Junior Year in France and others were based at Reid Hall. Elizabeth Mill Reid's daughter in law (and former social secretary) Helen Rogers Reid continued to own the property but in 1964 she gave the property to Columbia University. In September 2018, Reid Hall welcomed the Institute for Ideas and Imagination, an initiative launched by Columbia's President, Lee Bollinger. The combination of the Center and the Institute, bring to Reid Hall the significant resources provided by Columbia faculty, students, and administration.
