= The Club (Dasal book) =

2025 book by Jennifer Dasal

The Club: Where American Women Artists Found Refuge in Belle Époque Paris
- Cover of the book
- Author: Jennifer Dasal
- Language: English
- Subject: Art history
- Genre: Non-fiction
- Publisher: Bloomsbury Publishing
- Publication date: July 15, 2025
- Publication place: United States
- Pages: 336
- ISBN: 978-1-639-73130-5

The Club: Where American Women Artists Found Refuge in Belle Époque Paris is a 2025 non-fiction book about the American Girls' Club in Paris by Jennifer Dasal. The book was published by Bloomsbury Publishing on July 15. The book received positive reviews from Kirkus Reviews, Library Journal, and Publishers Weekly.
