= Miroslava Chavez-Garcia =

Historian specializing in Latinx studies and Chicano history in California

- Born: Mexicali, Baja California
- Known for: Chicana/o History, Race & Gender, Immigration & the Borderlands, Juvenile Justice

Academic background
- Education: University of California, Los Angeles, BA (1991), MA (1993), PhD (1998)

Academic work
- Discipline: History
- Institutions: University of California, Santa Barbara

Miroslava Chávez-García is a professor of history at the University of California, Santa Barbara. She holds joint appointments in the Departments of Chicana/o Studies and Feminist Studies. Chávez-García's research focuses on Chicana/o history, eugenics, gender, and juvenile justice. Chávez-García has authored three books: Negotiating Conquest (Tucson, 2004), States of Delinquency (Berkeley, 2012), and Migrant Longing (Chapel Hill, 2018). Her second work, States of Delinquency, was considered a groundbreaking text, describing California's eugenic program, which targeted young Mexican American and African American boys for irreversible sterilizations.

Chávez-García was born in Mexicali, Baja California, Mexico to farm worker parents. They moved to San Jose, California when she was an infant. She graduated from Notre Dame High School in 1986 and then received her B.A. (1991), M.A. (1993), and Ph.D. (1998), from the University of California, Los Angeles.

== Selected works ==
Books

- Negotiating Conquest: Gender and Power in California, 1770s to the 1880s (Tucson: University of Arizona Press, 2004).
- States of Delinquency: Race and Science in the Making of California’s Juvenile Justice System (Berkeley: University of California Press, 2012).
- Migrant Longing: Letter Writing Across the U.S.-Mexico Borderlands (Chapel Hill: University of North Carolina Press, 2018).
