= Mary Telfair =

American art collector and philanthropist

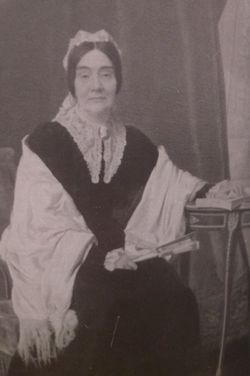
- Born: January 28, 1791; Augusta, Georgia, U.S.
- Died: June 2, 1875 (aged 84); Savannah, Georgia, U.S.
- Occupations: Philanthropist, art collector

Mary Telfair (January 28, 1791 – June 2, 1875) was an art collector, philanthropist and prominent citizen of Savannah, Georgia, United States. She bequeathed the foundation of the city's Telfair Museums, the first art museum of the American South, which has been in operation since 1886. It is housed in her former Regency-style home in Savannah's Telfair Square.

== Early life ==
Telfair was born in Augusta, Georgia, in 1791, the daughter of Edward Telfair, a Scot, who, at the age of 40, married 16-year-old Sarah Gibbons at her family's Sharon Plantation in 1774. Edward was halfway through his second term as governor of Georgia at the time of Mary's birth. They had eight other children, Mary being their first daughter. Telfair's sister, Margaret, later married William B. Hodgson.

She was schooled in New York from the age of ten, quickly becoming a "voracious reader" of writers such as Hannah More and Lord Byron.

Between 1799 and the early years of the 19th century, her family endured the deaths of her father and brothers Edward, Josiah and Thomas. Her inheritance from her father permitted her to travel, particularly and regularly to Europe, where she visited many museums, gardens, churches and universities.

== Art ==
Telfair began to collect art in her home in what was then called St. James Square in Savannah, Georgia. Following her death, an inventory of her estate revealed that her collections numbered over 200 pieces, including paintings, prints, statues and plaster casts.

== Philanthropy ==
As the last of the Telfair family, she shared her wealth with the City of Savannah. Her will stated that funds be used to complete W. B. Hodgson Hall (built in 1876 and named for her brother-in-law, who died five years previously) for the Georgia Historical Society to use as their home. She also endowed the Savannah Widow's Society and founded the Mary Telfair Hospital for Women (now part of Candler Hospital). Her most well-known legacy, however, is the Telfair Academy (located in her former home, designed by noted architect William Jay), which opened to the public in 1886.

== Personal life ==
Telfair never married, largely as it was not a financial necessity as it was for many women of her era.

== Death ==
Telfair died in 1875, aged 84. She is buried in Savannah's Bonaventure Cemetery, although her plot is separate from her family due to "family rifts".
