= Carl Ludwig Brandt =

American painter

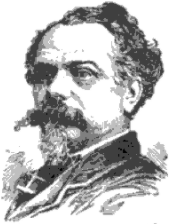
- Born: September 22, 1831; Hamburg
- Died: January 20, 1905 (aged 73); Savannah
- Resting place: Bonaventure Cemetery

Carl Ludwig Brandt (September 22, 1831 – January 20, 1905) was an artist born near Hamburg who worked mostly in the United States.

== Biography ==
Brandt was born near Hamburg in Holstein, Germany on September 22, 1831. His father and grandfather were physicians in Hamburg. His father taught him drawing at the age of seven, and he subsequently studied in the principal galleries of Europe, including the Academy of Art in Copenhagen. He served in the First War of Schleswig (1848–1850), between various German states and Denmark.

He came to the United States in 1852. In 1862 he became a member of the National Academy of Design. He painted several portraits previous to 1864, and in that year built his studio in Hastings-on-Hudson, New York, but lived in Europe from 1865 until 1869. He was chosen a national academician in 1872, and in 1883 was elected first director of the Telfair Academy of Arts and Sciences, Savannah, Georgia, where he resided in winter. At Telfair he offered art instruction and oversaw art acquisitions, including plaster casts, thus transforming a family mansion into a cultural institution. Several of his own murals that depict major cultural sites and artistic masters of the old world decorate the walls of the galleries.

After his return from Europe, he did numerous portraits, including likenesses of John Jacob Astor the elder, Mr. and Mrs. William B. Astor, Dr. John W. Draper, George S. Appleton, Gen. Henry R. Jackson, and a full-length figure of his wife.

The last was shown at the academy exhibition of 1882 and the international exposition at Munich in 1883. Friedrich Pecht, in his Modern Art at the International Exhibition, says of it: "The most skillful of all these ladies' portraits is the one in full figure by Carl L. Brandt, in fact, a most charming picture, a masterpiece good enough for a Netcher." Brandt did some work as a sculptor, and in 1886 had nearly completed a colossal bust of Alexander von Humboldt.

Brandt died in Savannah on January 20, 1905, and was buried at Bonaventure Cemetery.

== Works ==
Among his works are:

- A Dish of Alpine Strawberries
- The Fortune-Teller (1869)
- Return from the Alps (1874)
- Monte Rosa at Sunrise
- Bay of Naples during Eruption of Vesuvius in 1867
- Etna from Taurinino, Sicily
- Resignation
- The Golden Treasures of Mexico
