= Telfair Museums =

Art museum in Savannah, Georgia, United States

Coordinates: 32°04′44″N 81°05′43″W

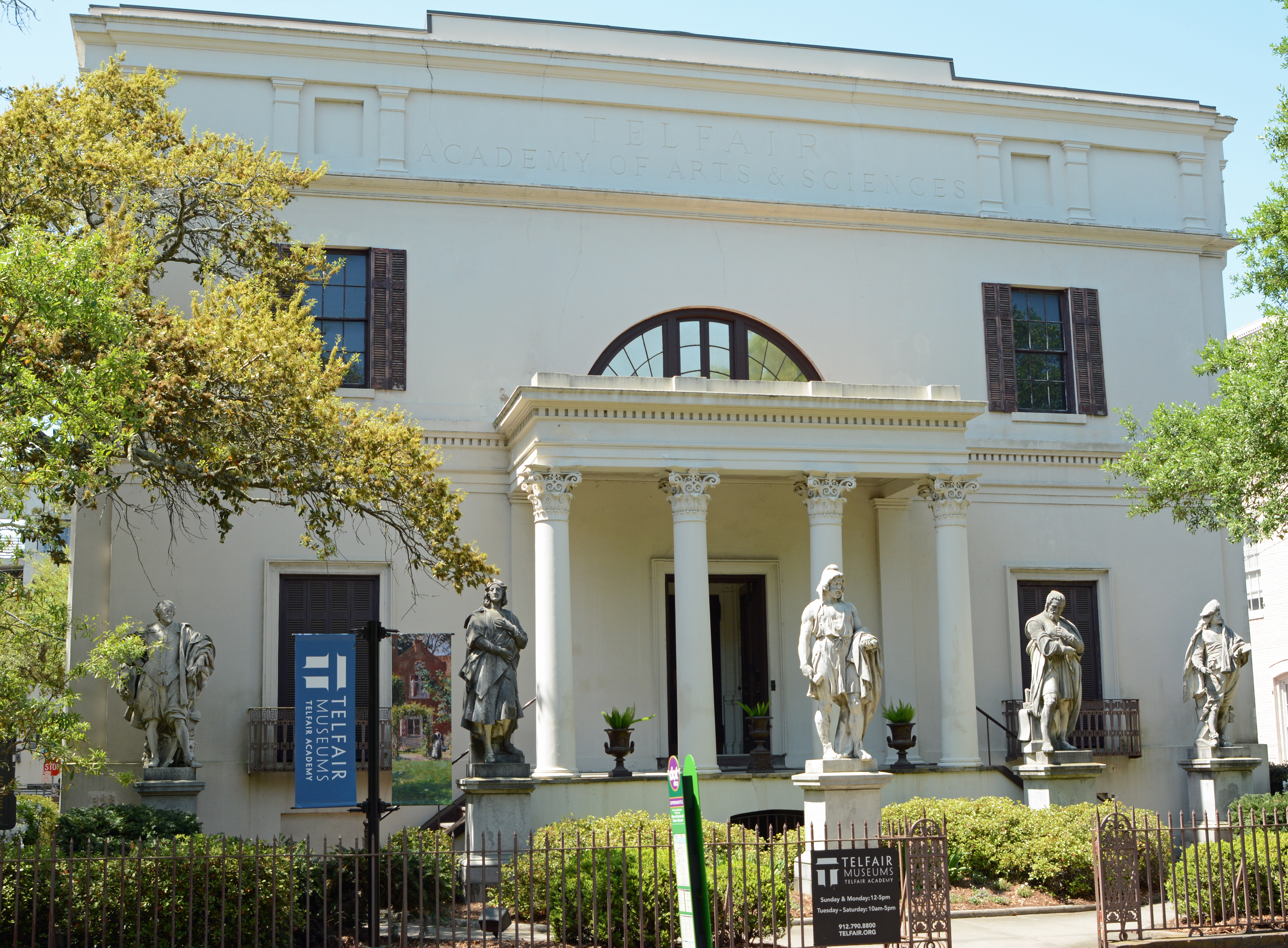
- Telfair Academy in 2015
- Location: Savannah, Georgia; United States
- Type: Art museum
- Curator: Elyse Gerstenecker
- Public transit access: Chatham Area Transit
- Website: www.telfair.org

Telfair Museums, in the historic district of Savannah, Georgia, was the first public art museum in the Southern United States. Founded through the bequest of Mary Telfair (1791–1875), a prominent local citizen, and operated by the Georgia Historical Society until 1920, the museum opened in 1886 in the Telfair family's renovated Regency style mansion, known as the Telfair Academy.

The museum currently contains a collection of over 4,500 American and European paintings, sculptures, and works on paper, housed in three buildings: the 1818 Telfair Academy (formerly the Telfair family home); the 1816 Owens-Thomas House & Slave Quarters, which are both National Historic Landmarks designed by British architect William Jay in the early nineteenth century; and the contemporary Jepson Center for the Arts, designed by Moshe Safdie and completed in 2006.

== Buildings ==
Each of the museum's three buildings houses a collection corresponding to the era in which it was built.

=== Telfair Academy ===
The Telfair Academy contains two nineteenth-century period rooms, and it houses nineteenth- and twentieth-century American and European art from the museum's permanent collection including paintings, works on paper, sculpture, and decorative arts. The Bird Girl statue is currently on view in this building as part of the museum's "BEFORE MIDNIGHT: BONAVENTURE AND THE BIRD GIRL" exhibition.

=== Owens-Thomas House & Slave Quarters ===
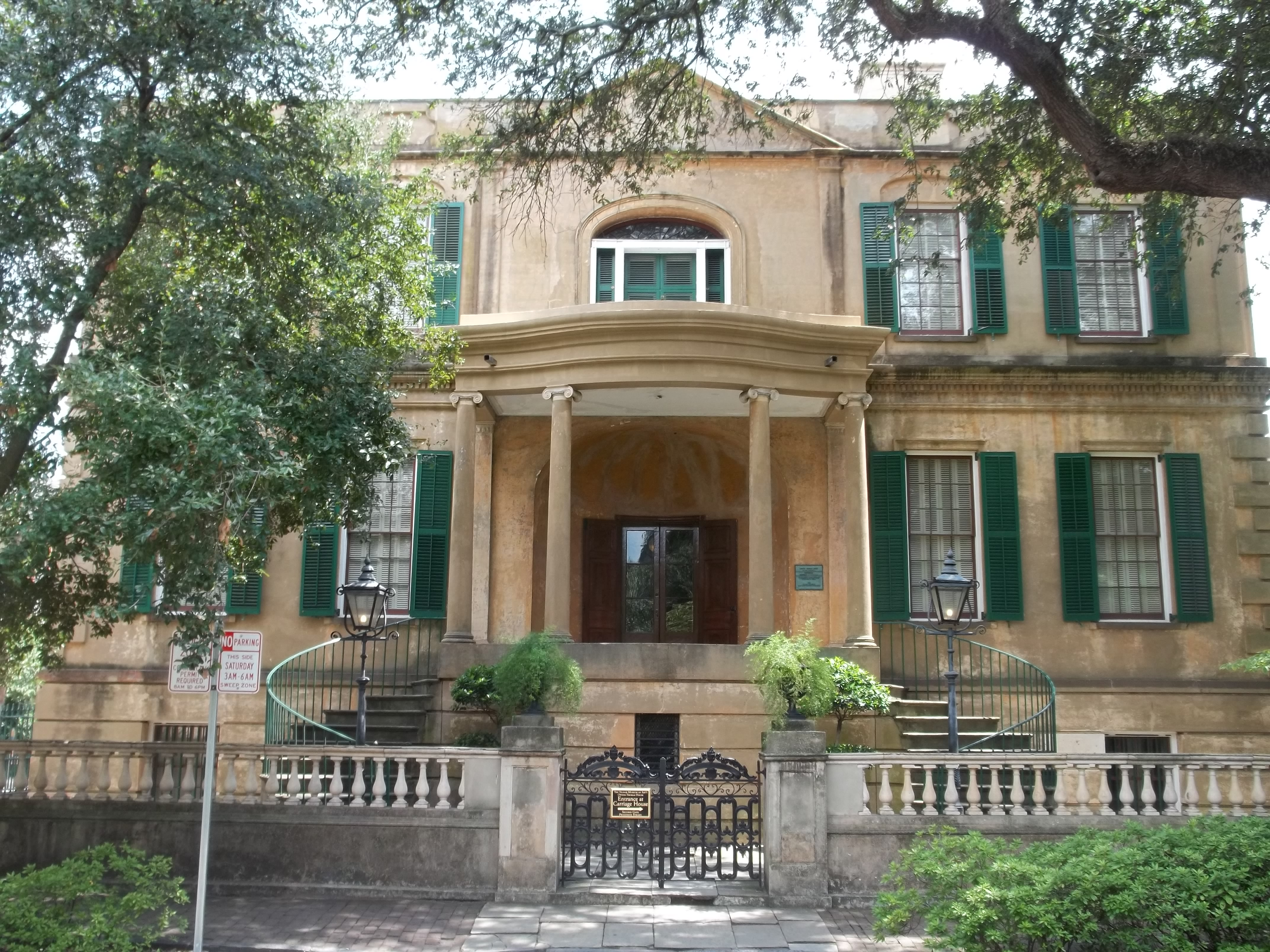
Owens-Thomas House in 2011

The Owens-Thomas House & Slave Quarters contains a decorative arts collection composed primarily of Owens family furnishings, along with American and European objects dating from 1750 to 1830. Additionally the site includes intact urban slave quarters and a parterre garden.

=== Jepson Center ===
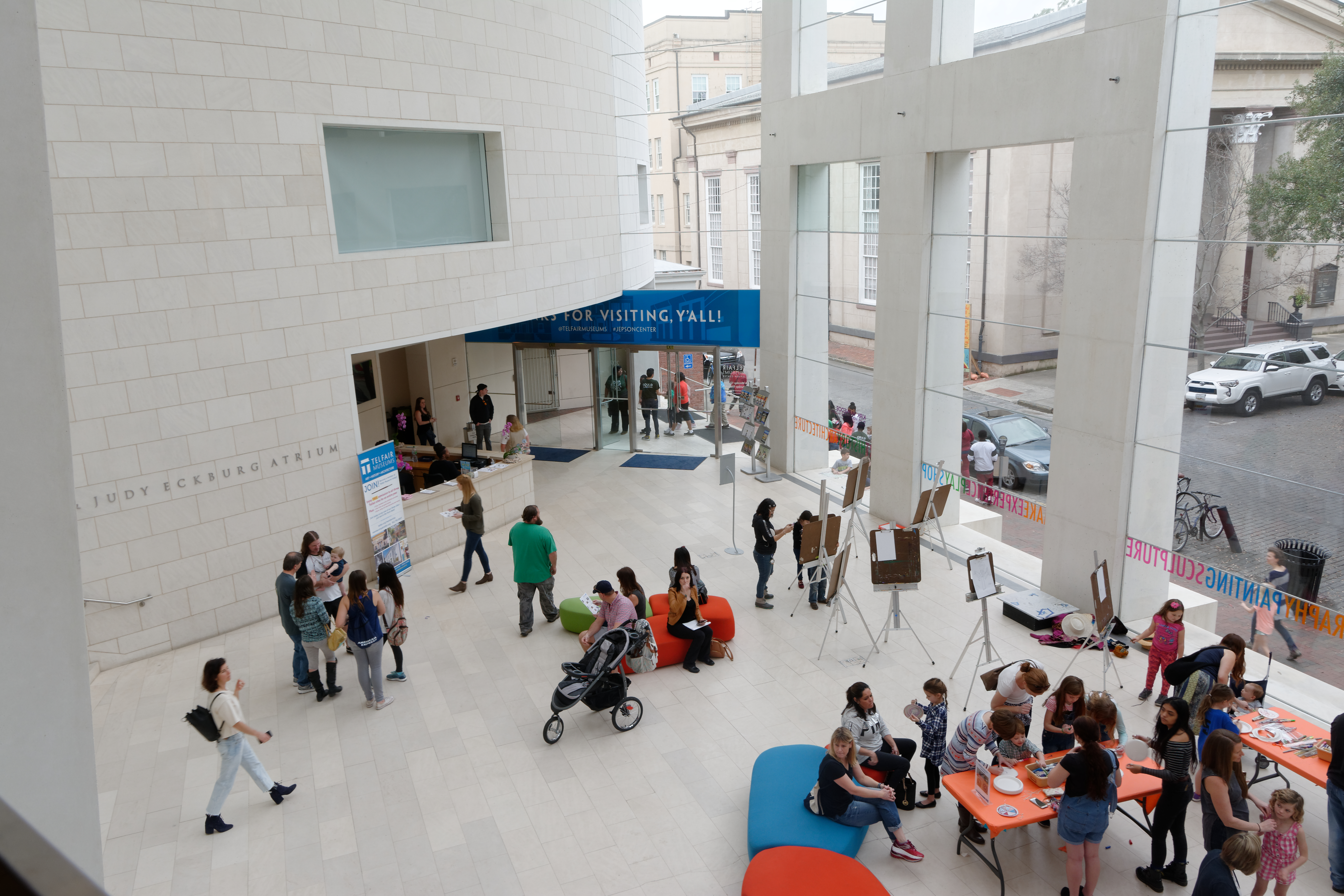
Lobby of the Jepson Center

The Jepson Center for the Arts features contemporary art galleries of American Southern art, African American art, photography, works-on-paper, two galleries for large traveling exhibitions, a community gallery, a children's gallery, and two outdoor sculpture terraces.
