= Jean Templeton Ward =

American-born philanthropist and society hostess (1884–1962)

Jean Templeton Ward CBE DStJ
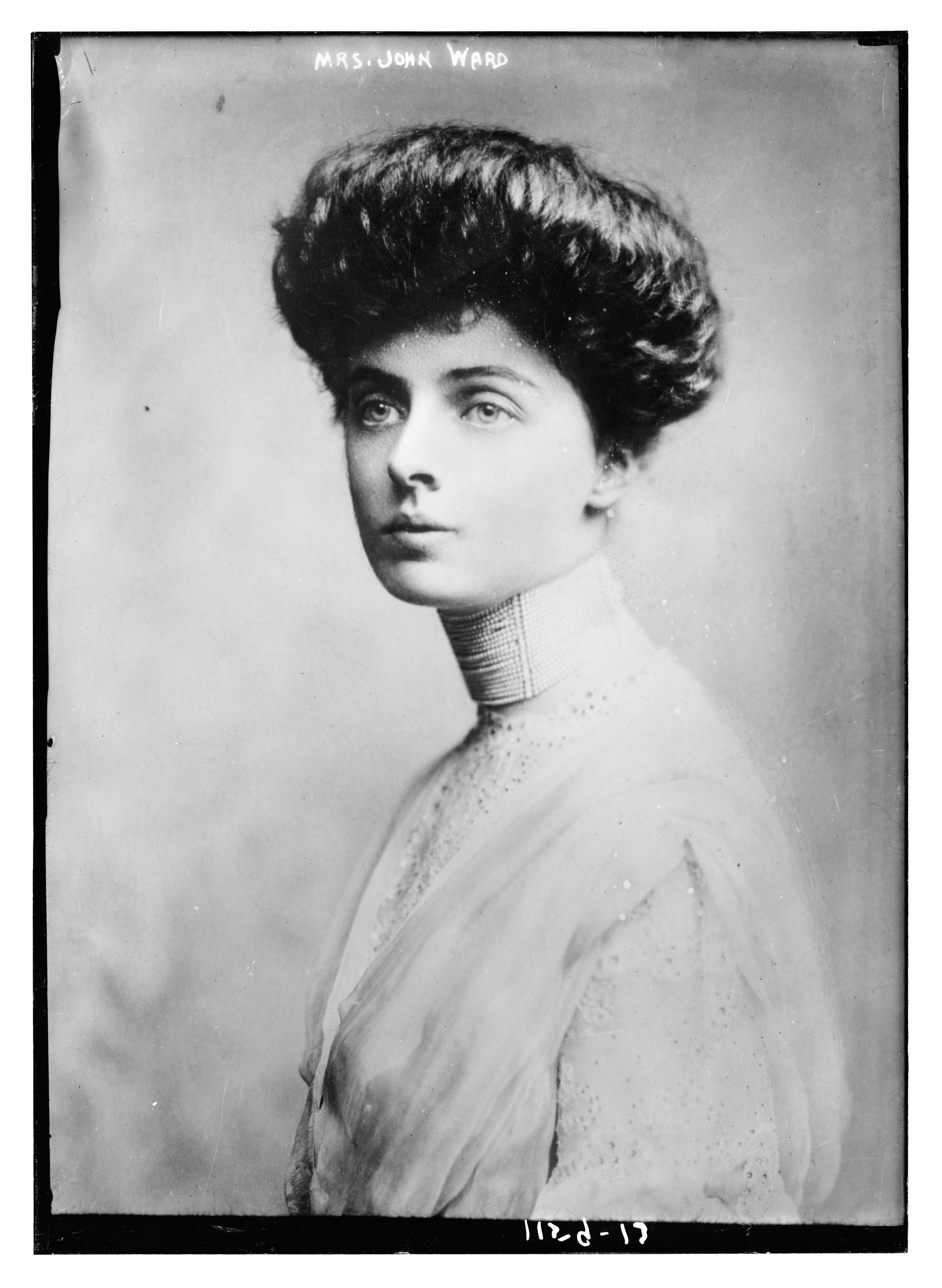

Personal details
- Born: Jean Templeton Reid; 13 July 1884 New York City, United States
- Died: 1 May 1962 (aged 77) London, England
- Spouse: Sir John Hubert Ward (m. 1908; died 1938)
- Children: 2
- Parent(s): Whitelaw Reid; Elisabeth Mills Reid
- Relatives: Ogden Mills Reid (brother); Darius Ogden Mills (grandfather); Ogden Mills (uncle); Gladys Mills Phipps (cousin); Beatrice Forbes, Countess of Granard (cousin); Ogden L. Mills (cousin)

Jean Templeton, Lady Ward CBE, DStJ (née Reid; 13 July 1884 – 1 May 1962) was an American-born philanthropist and society hostess. The only daughter of Whitelaw Reid, the American ambassador to the United Kingdom, she lived in London after her marriage to Hon. Sir John Hubert Ward, second son of William Ward, 1st Earl of Dudley.

== Early life ==
Ward was a daughter of Whitelaw Reid and Elisabeth Mills Reid (1857–1931), Her older brother was New York publisher Ogden Mills Reid, who married Helen Miles Rogers. Her father served as the U.S. Minister to France (under President Benjamin Harrison) and as U.S. Ambassador to the United Kingdom (under Presidents Theodore Roosevelt and William Howard Taft) until his death in 1912. Her parents were social people known for throwing lavish parties, including a musicale at their residence in Manhattan, at Madison Avenue and 50th Street, for 400 people, in 1901. Shortly before her father's death, he hosted the Duke and Duchess of Connaught at his New York home.

Her maternal grandparents were financier Darius Ogden Mills and Jane Templeton (née Cunningham) Mills. Her maternal uncle was financier and Thoroughbred racehorse owner Ogden Mills. Her cousins included Gladys Livingston Mills (wife of Henry Carnegie Phipps), Beatrice Mills (wife of Bernard Forbes, 8th Earl of Granard), Ogden Livingston Mills (the 50th United States Secretary of the Treasury who married Margaret Stuyvesant Rutherfurd).

== Personal life ==
Ward's engagement to the 38-year-old Hon. Sir John Hubert Ward (1870–1938), was announced in April 1908. He was the second son of William Ward, 1st Earl of Dudley and Georgina Moncreiffe. His paternal grandfather was William Humble Ward, 10th Baron Ward and his maternal grandfather was Sir Thomas Moncreiffe, 7th Baronet. They were married on 23 June 1908 at the Chapel Royal, St. James's Palace in a ceremony attended by King Edward VII and Queen Alexandra. The wedding was celebrated at Dorchester House, and was considered one of the greatest society events of the year. Together, the couple had two sons:

- Edward John Sutton Ward MC (1909–1990), who married Margaret Susan Corbett in 1934. After her death in 1981, he married as her fourth husband Marion Elizabeth Jessie (née Clover), third wife of William Romilly, 4th Baron Romilly, in 1986. His godfather was King Edward VII.
- Alexander Reginald Ward (1914–1987), a Justice of the Peace for Berkshire between 1941 and 1947, who married Ilona Hollos in 1946. They divorced in 1959 and he married Zena Moyra Marshall in 1967. They divorced 1969 and he married Constance Cluett Sage.

Ward was an "accomplished horsewoman... excellent musician" and fluent in several languages including German and Italian. In 1912, Sir John paid £10,000 for Dudley House, a 44,000 square foot London townhouse that was built for his ancestor, the 6th Baron Ward. The house, where the Wards hosted the King and Queen in 1914, (Note: The guests at their dinner on 11 February 1914 at Dudley House with King Edward VII and Queen Alexandra included Count Albert von Mensdorff-Pouilly-Dietrichstein (the Austro-Hungarian ambassador), the Duchess of Roxburghe, Lord and Lady Crewe, Lord and Lady Granard, Lord and Lady Ripon, the Marquis de Soveral, Mrs Arthur Sassoon, Lord Durham, the Right Hon. Arthur Balfour, Lady Evelyn Ward, Lord Revelstoke, the Dowager Lady Dudley (mother of the host), Mrs Whitelaw Reid (mother of the hostess), Lady Ampthill, Lord Granville and Sir Colin Keppel.) was bombed during the War. The Wards also had a country estate, known as Chilton, in Hungerford, Berkshire. For her charitable work during World War II, Lady Ward was made a Commander of the British Empire and a Dame of the Order of Saint John.

Sir John died at their home, Dudley House in London, on 2 December 1938. Lady Ward died in May 1962.
