= John Hubert Ward =

British army officer and courtier (1870–1938)

The Honourable Sir John Hubert Ward KCVO

Personal details
- Born: 20 March 1870 Scotland
- Died: 2 December 1938 (aged 68) London, England
- Spouse: Jean Templeton Reid (m. 1908)
- Children: 2
- Parent(s): William Ward, 1st Earl of Dudley; Georgina Moncreiffe
- Education: Eton College

Military service
- Allegiance: United Kingdom
- Branch/service: British Army; Worcestershire Yeomanry
- Rank: Major
- Battles/wars: Second Boer War; First World War

Major Sir John Hubert Ward KCVO (20 March 1870 – 2 December 1938) was a British army officer and courtier.

== Early life ==
Ward was the second son of William Ward, 1st Earl of Dudley by his wife Georgina Elizabeth née Moncreiffe. His paternal grandfather was William Humble Ward, 10th Baron Ward and his maternal grandfather was Sir Thomas Moncreiffe, 7th Baronet.

Following his father's death in 1885, his brother, William Humble Ward, succeeded as the 2nd Earl of Dudley. His other siblings included Robert Ward, a member of parliament for Crewe. All six sons of the 1st Earl received half a million dollars upon their father's death.

Ward was educated at Eton College.

== Career ==
He was commissioned as a second lieutenant in the Worcestershire Yeomanry (The Queen's Own Worcestershire Hussars) on 11 January 1900, and served in the Second Boer War 1900–1901, as an aide to Major Gen. John Palmer Brabazon. He was promoted to lieutenant, and later fought in the First World War and gained the rank of major.

In 1901, Ward was the Assistant Private Secretary to the Financial Secretary to the War Office, Edward Stanley, 17th Earl of Derby. Ward served as an Equerry to four successive British monarchs. He was appointed Equerry to King Edward VII 28 February 1902, and served until the King's death in 1910. He was then an Extra Equerry to King George V 1910–1936, to King Edward VIII in 1936, and to King George VI from 1937 until the following year, when he died.

== Personal life ==
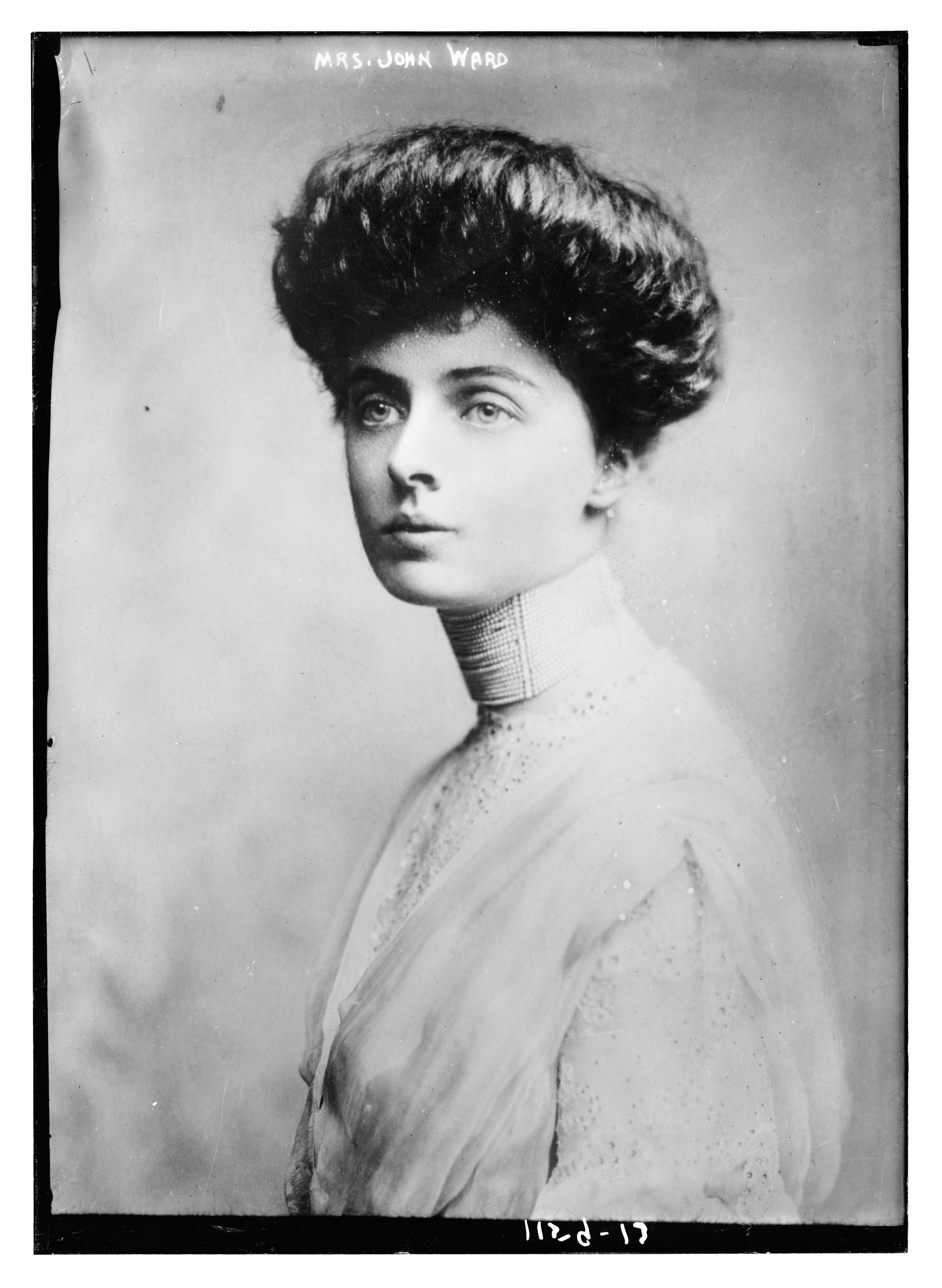
Ward's wife, Jean Templeton Reid.

Ward's engagement to Jean Templeton Reid (1884–1962) was announced in April 1908. She was the daughter of Whitelaw Reid, American ambassador to the United Kingdom, sister of Ogden Mills Reid, a New York publisher, the granddaughter of Darius Ogden Mills, an American financier, and the niece of Ogden Mills, a prominent New York Society man. Ward and Reid met through George Holford, also equerry-in-waiting to the King.

On 23 June 1908, the 38-year-old Ward married Reid at the Chapel Royal, St. James's Palace in a ceremony attended by King Edward VII and Queen Alexandra. The wedding was celebrated at Dorchester House, and was one of the greatest society events of the year. Together, the couple had two sons:

- Edward John Sutton Ward, MC (1909–1990), who married Margaret Susan Corbett (d. 1981) in 1934. After her death, he married Marion Elizabeth Jessie Clover (d. 1997), the former wife of William Romilly, 4th Baron Romilly, in 1986. His godfather was King Edward VII.
- Alexander Reginald Ward (1914–1987), a Justice of the Peace for Berkshire between 1941 and 1947, who married Ilona Hollos in 1946. They divorced in 1959 and he married Zena Moyra Marshall in 1967. They divorced 1969 and he married Constance Cluett Sage. He was one of the founders of Chilton Aircraft.

The Wards had a country estate, known as Chilton, in Hungerford, Berkshire. Ward died at his home, Dudley House in London, on 2 December 1938. Lady Ward died in 1962.

=== Awards and honours ===
He was decorated with the award of the Officer of French Legion of Honour, Commander of the Order of Isabella the Catholic of Spain, Commander of the Order of Zähringer Löwen of Baden, and Commander of the Order of the Dannebrog of Denmark.

Ward was also invested as a Knight Commander of the Royal Victorian Order and as an Officer of the Most Venerable Order of the Hospital of St. John of Jerusalem.
