= Dudley Fountain =

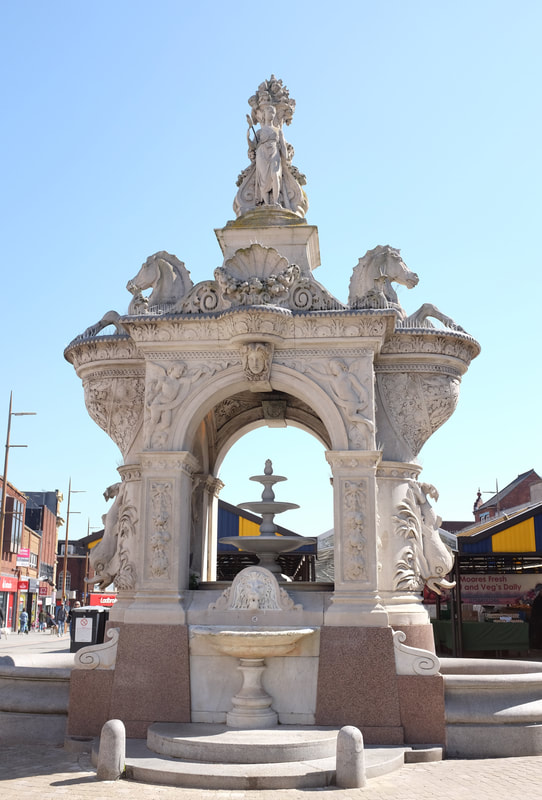
- Dudley Fountain
- Interactive map of the Dudley Fountain area

General information
- Type: Drinking fountain
- Location: Market place, Dudley, West Midlands
- Coordinates: 52.510383°N 2.082499°W
- Completed: 17 October 1867

Renovating team
- Architect: James Forsyth

Listed Building – Grade II*
- Designated: 14 September 1949
- Reference no.: 1343214

Dudley Fountain is a Grade II* listed drinking fountain located in Dudley, West Midlands, England. It has stood in the town market place since 1867.

== History ==
After Dudley market place was cleaned and paved by the newly established Borough Council, there was a need for a public amenity that would ornament and enhance the market place. The fountain was designed by James Forsyth, a Scottish sculptor who had also designed the Perseus and Andromeda fountain at Whitley Court in Worcestershire. William Ward, 1st Earl of Dudley presented the fountain to the town and this was opened by Georgina Ward, Countess of Dudley at an elaborate ceremony on 17 October 1867. The Countess became the first person to drink from the fountain using a specially engraved goblet. She said she hoped the fountain had "a career of usefulness in store for it".

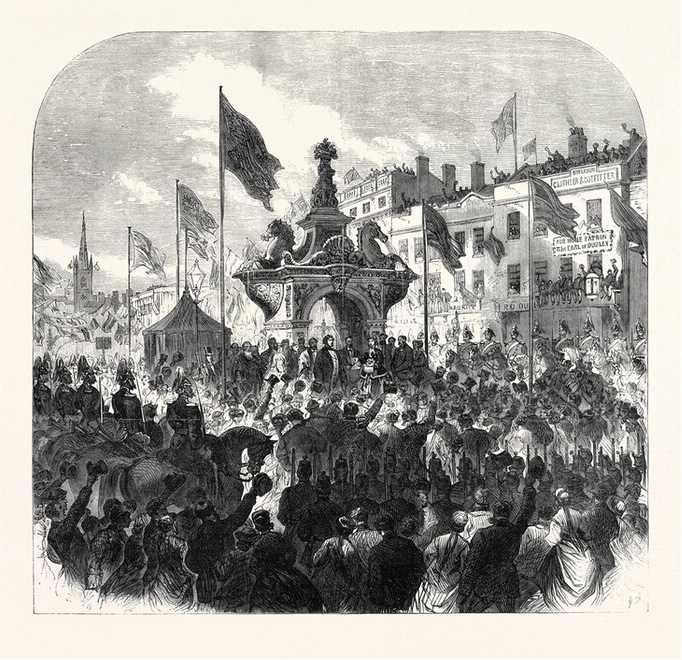
A drawing of the opening of the Dudley Fountain in 1867 by the Illustrated London News

In 2014, Dudley Council announced the fountain would undergo restoration work costing £150,000. The work included restoration of two statues, a new tiered central water fountain in the fountain’s archway and the restoration of the two water basins. Repairs were also made to the stonework and the original white colour of the Portland stone was restored. Work began in 2014 and was completed in 2015.
