= Gerald Ward (cricketer) =

English cricketer and British Army officer

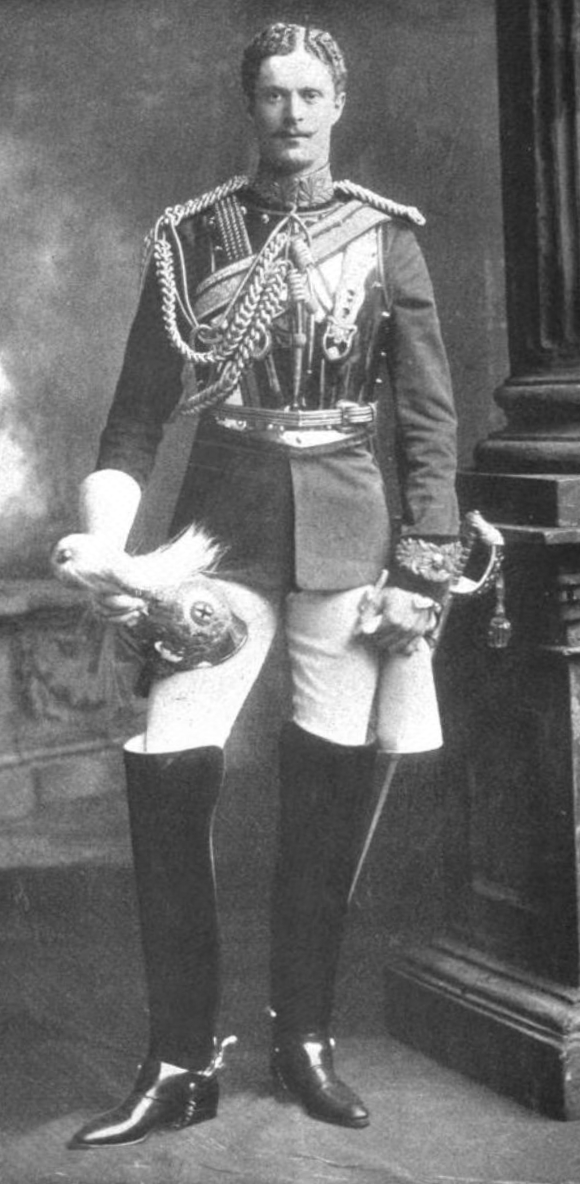
- In The Sketch, 16 August 1899

Personal information
- Full name: Gerald Ernest Francis Ward
- Born: 9 November 1877; Himley, Staffordshire, England
- Died: 30 October 1914 (aged 36); Zandvoorde, West Flanders, Belgium
- Batting: Right-handed
- Bowling: Right-arm fast
- Relatives: Lord Ward (father); Sir Thomas Moncreiffe (grandfather); Dermot Blundell (brother-in-law)

Domestic team information
- Years: Team
- 1903: Marylebone Cricket Club

Career statistics
Competition	First-class
Matches	1
Runs scored	8
Batting average	8.00
100s/50s	–/–
Top score	8
Catches/stumpings	–/–
- Source: Cricinfo, 21 January 2021

Gerald Ernest Francis Ward MVO (9 November 1877 – 30 October 1914) was an English first-class cricketer and British Army officer.

== Biography ==
The son of William Ward, 1st Earl of Dudley, he was born at the family home of Himley Hall in Staffordshire in November 1877. He was educated at Eton College, where he was the most successful bowler of his year. After completing his education at Eton, he opted for a career in the military. He initially served as a second lieutenant in the Worcestershire Regiment, before transferring to the 1st Life Guards in January 1899. Later that year he gained promotion to lieutenant. Ward served in the Second Boer War from 1899 to 1902. Following the conclusion of the war, Ward returned to England where he played in a first-class cricket match for the Marylebone Cricket Club (MCC) against Oxford University at Lord's in 1903. Batting just once in a drawn match, Ward scored 8 runs in the MCC first innings before being dismissed by Adolph von Ernsthausen.

Ward served his elder brother, the 2nd Earl of Dudley, as his aide-de-camp during his tenure as Lord Lieutenant of Ireland. He was invested as a member of the Royal Victorian Order in May 1904, as part of the visit of Edward VII to Ireland. He was placed on the reserve list of officers in March 1907.

Ward served with the 1st Life Guards at the outbreak of the First World War, where he saw action during the first few months of the conflict on the Western Front. He fought at the First Battle of Ypres, where he was killed in action at Zandvoorde on 30 October 1914. His body was never recovered and he is commemorated at the Menin Gate. He was survived by his widow, Lady Evelyn Selina Louisa Crichton, daughter of John Crichton, 4th Earl Erne. His grandfather, Sir Thomas Moncreiffe, and brother-in-law, Dermot Blundell, both played first-class cricket.
