= Romilly =

Romilly may refer to:

== People ==
- Romilly (given name)
- Romilly (surname)
- Baron Romilly, title created in 1866

== Places ==
- in France:
  - Romilly, Loir-et-Cher, in the Loir-et-Cher department
  - Romilly-la-Puthenaye, in the Eure department
  - Romilly-sur-Aigre, in the Eure-et-Loir department
  - Romilly-sur-Andelle, in the Eure department
  - Romilly-sur-Seine, in the Aube department
- Romilly, Vale of Glamorgan, a district of Barry, Vale of Glamorgan, Wales

== See also ==
- Romiley, a town in Greater Manchester, United Kingdom
