= William Humble Ward =

William Humble Ward may refer to:

- William Ward, 2nd Earl of Dudley (1867–1932), British aristocrat, politician and military officer
- William Humble Ward, 10th Baron Ward (1781–1835), clergyman
