= Tom Marlowe =

Tom Marlowe may refer to:

- Tom Marlowe, winner of the 1963 Pacific Northwest PGA Championship
- Tom Marlowe, a character in Good News (musical)
- Tom Marlowe, a character in Six Days, Seven Nights
- Tom Marlowe, a character from an eponymous series of books by Chris Priestley

== See also ==
- Thomas Marlow, English cricketer
