= Romilly (given name) =

Romilly is a unisex given name, a transferred use of an English surname derived from the French place name Romilly.

== Men ==
- Romilly Craze (1892–1974), English architect
- Romilly Fedden (1875–1939), English artist and watercolorist
- Romilly Holdsworth (1899–1976), English scholar, academic, educationalist, cricketer and Himalayan mountaineer
- Romilly Jenkins (1907–1969), British scholar
- Romilly John (1906–1986) British Royal Air Force officer, poet, author and amateur physicist.
- Romilly Lunge (1904–1994), British actor

== Women ==
- Romilly Madew (née Evans; born ca. 1966), Australian business executive
- Romilly Newman (born 1998), American chef, social media personality, and food stylist
- Romilly Weeks (born 1973), English journalist
