= John Romilly =

John Romilly may refer to:

- John Romilly, 1st Baron Romilly (1802–1874), English judge
- John Romilly, 3rd Baron Romilly, British peer and soldier

== See also ==
- Romilly John (1906–1986), poet, author and an amateur physicist, son of Augustus John
- John Romilly Allen, British archaeologist
