= Lady Dudley =

Lady Dudley may refer to

- Amy Robsart (1532–1560), 1st Countess of Leicester and the wife of Robert Dudley
- Georgina Ward, Countess of Dudley (1846–1929), British countess
- Jenna Jameson (1974 - ), American pornographic actress who assumed the role of Lady Dudley in Dudley family professional wrestling stable
