= Spring (Millais painting) =

Painting by John Everett Millais

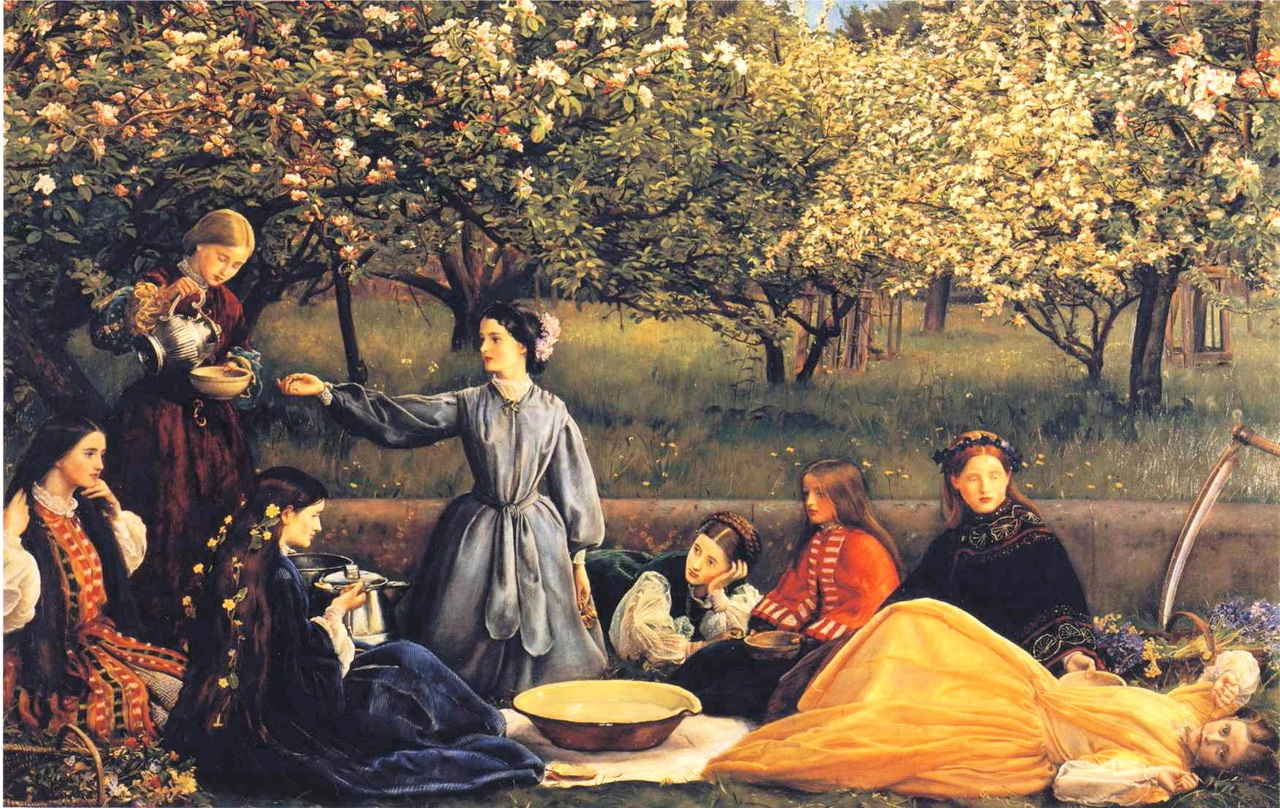
- Artist: John Everett Millais
- Year: 1856–59
- Type: Oil on canvas
- Dimensions: 113 cm × 176.3 cm (44 in × 69.4 in)
- Location: National Museums Liverpool: on display at Lady Lever Art Gallery, Port Sunlight, Merseyside

Spring, also known as Apple Blossoms, is an 1856–59 oil painting by the English artist John Everett Millais. The painting shows a group of eight girls picnicking in an apple orchard during the spring blossom period. The subjects are variously standing, kneeling, sitting and lying; the reclining girl in yellow at the right of the painting holds the viewer in a direct gaze.

== The painting ==
Millais' 1858–59 painting The Vale of Rest was conceived as a pendant (companion piece) to Spring: both deal with ideas of mortality.

Spring is described by National Museums Liverpool:

"A group ... are enjoying an idyllic picnic of milk and cream. They are in the bloom of early youth and the apple blossom behind them represents the fragile beauty of adolescence - the rich ephemeral splendour of spring, the beginning of the new year. However, the idyll cannot last. The beauty of both girls and apple blossom will soon fade; the scythe and cut flowers at the right indicating their fate. This is a mood picture - in this case the 'mood' or underlying theme is the transience of youth and beauty.".

Millais first planned to make a painting of apple blossom in spring 1856, but it wasn't started until the autumn of 1856, at Annat Lodge in Perth, where Millais and Effie Gray had settled after their marriage. The planned painting was to feature a knight looking on at a lady amongst apple blossom, with the prospective title Faint Heart Never Won Fair Ladye. This idea was abandoned, and the following spring (1857) the new tenant at Annat Lodge would not allow Millais access to continue painting there, so he worked in the orchard of a neighbour, Mrs Seton, who spoiled him somewhat. In 1858 he was working in another orchard, that of Mr Gentle. In the two springs of 1857 and 1858 he finished the background and some of the figures. At this time Millais called the painting Apple Blossoms; it later became known more popularly as Spring.

Millais was in the habit of using family and friends as models, and Effie noted

"The centre figure was painted from Sir Thomas Moncrieff's daughter Georgiana (afterwards Lady Dudley); Sophie Gray, my sister, is at the left side of the picture. Alice is there too, in two positions, one resting on her elbow, singularly like, and the other lying on her back with a grass stem in her mouth."

Millais' reference in a letter to "Sophie's and Alice's heads to the left of the picture" implies that Alice may also have sat a third time, for the seated figure in blue, third from the left. Georgina's sister Helen, later Lady Forbes, also appears in the picture; according to family tradition, she is the figure second from the right. Another model, perhaps for the girl in the red cloak, was one Agnes Stewart; and another is said to have been Henrietta Riley - perhaps for the girl second from the left. Sadly Effie's diaries only give partial identifications.

Millais was still working on the painting in September 1858. It was exhibited under the title Spring at the Royal Academy Exhibition of 1859, alongside Millais' The Vale of Rest (1856–59). Like The Vale of Rest, Millais did not manage to sell Spring at the exhibition, nor at the exhibition at the Liverpool Academy later that year. It was bought by the dealer Ernest Gambart around 6 May 1860. Gambart failed to find a buyer and so auctioned it at Christie's on 3 May 1861. The first collector to own it was Jacob Burnett of Newcastle, who owned it from 1861 to about 1876. (Note: The same publication says that the painting was owned by Pre-Raphaelite collector Thomas Plint at the time of his death in 1861, but this information is not present in the Provenance section of the National Museums Liverpool page about the painting, so may be in error. The painting does not appear among the list of Plint's five Millais paintings sold at auction on his death.)

The National Heritage Memorial Fund provided funds to assist with the purchase of the painting for the Lady Lever Art Gallery, part of National Museums Liverpool, in 1986.

== See also ==
- List of paintings by John Everett Millais
