= Dermot Blundell =

English cricketer and British Army officer (1874–1910)

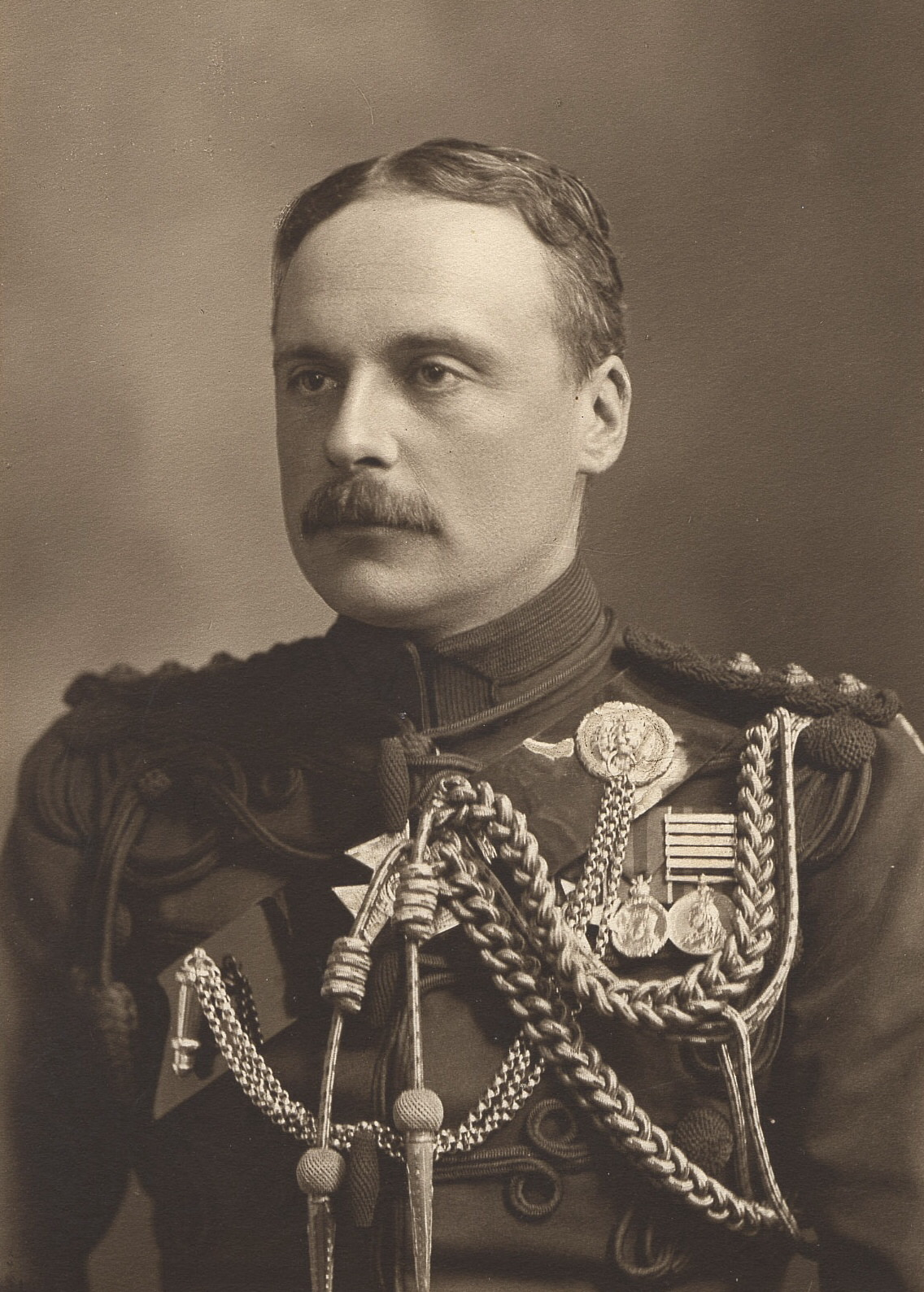

Personal information
- Full name: Dermot Howard Blundell-Hollinshead-Blundell
- Born: 27 February 1874; Mayfair, Middlesex, England
- Died: 26 October 1910 (aged 36); Kensington, London, England
- Batting: Right-handed
- Relatives: Gerald Ward (brother-in-law)

Domestic team information
- Years: Team
- 1895–1904: Berkshire
- 1902: Marylebone Cricket Club

Career statistics
Competition	First-class
Matches	1
Runs scored	45
Batting average	45.00
100s/50s	–/–
Top score	45
Catches/stumpings	–/–
- Source: Cricinfo, 13 February 2019

Dermot Howard Blundell-Hollinshead-Blundell MVO (27 February 1874 – 26 October 1910) was an English first-class cricketer and British Army officer. He served in the Second Boer War and played first-class cricket for the Marylebone Cricket Club.

== Early life and military career ==
The son of Major-General Richard Blundell-Hollinshead-Blundell and his wife, Henrietta Frances Kirwan, he was educated at Wellington College, Berkshire, where he played for the college cricket team in 1890 and 1891. After graduating from the Royal Military College in April 1894, he entered into the British Army as a second lieutenant in the Royal Irish Regiment.

By July 1897, he was serving with the King's Royal Rifle Corps, with promotion to lieutenant coming in that month. Blundell was appointed as a member of the Royal Victorian Order in November 1900. He served during the Second Boer War. In May 1903, he was an acting captain serving as aide-de-camp to Lord Grenfell. He was promoted permanently to the rank of captain in December 1905. He was promoted to brigade major in February 1907.

== Cricket and personal life ==
He made his debut in minor counties cricket for Berkshire in their first ever Minor Counties Championship, played in 1895 against Hertfordshire. His military career limited his appearances for Berkshire in minor counties cricket, with him making ten appearances up to 1904. He did make one appearance in first-class cricket for the Marylebone Cricket Club (MCC) against Leicestershire at Lord's in 1902. Batting once during the match, he scored 45 runs in the MCC first-innings before being dismissed by Thomas Marlow.

He married Eugenie Sybil Ward in June 1901, with the couple having one son. Blundell died at Kensington in October 1910. His brother-in-law, Gerald Ward, was also a first-class cricketer.
