= Sechs Lieder, Op. 59 (Mendelssohn) =

Sechs Lieder
- Im Freien zu singen
- Part songs by Felix Mendelssohn
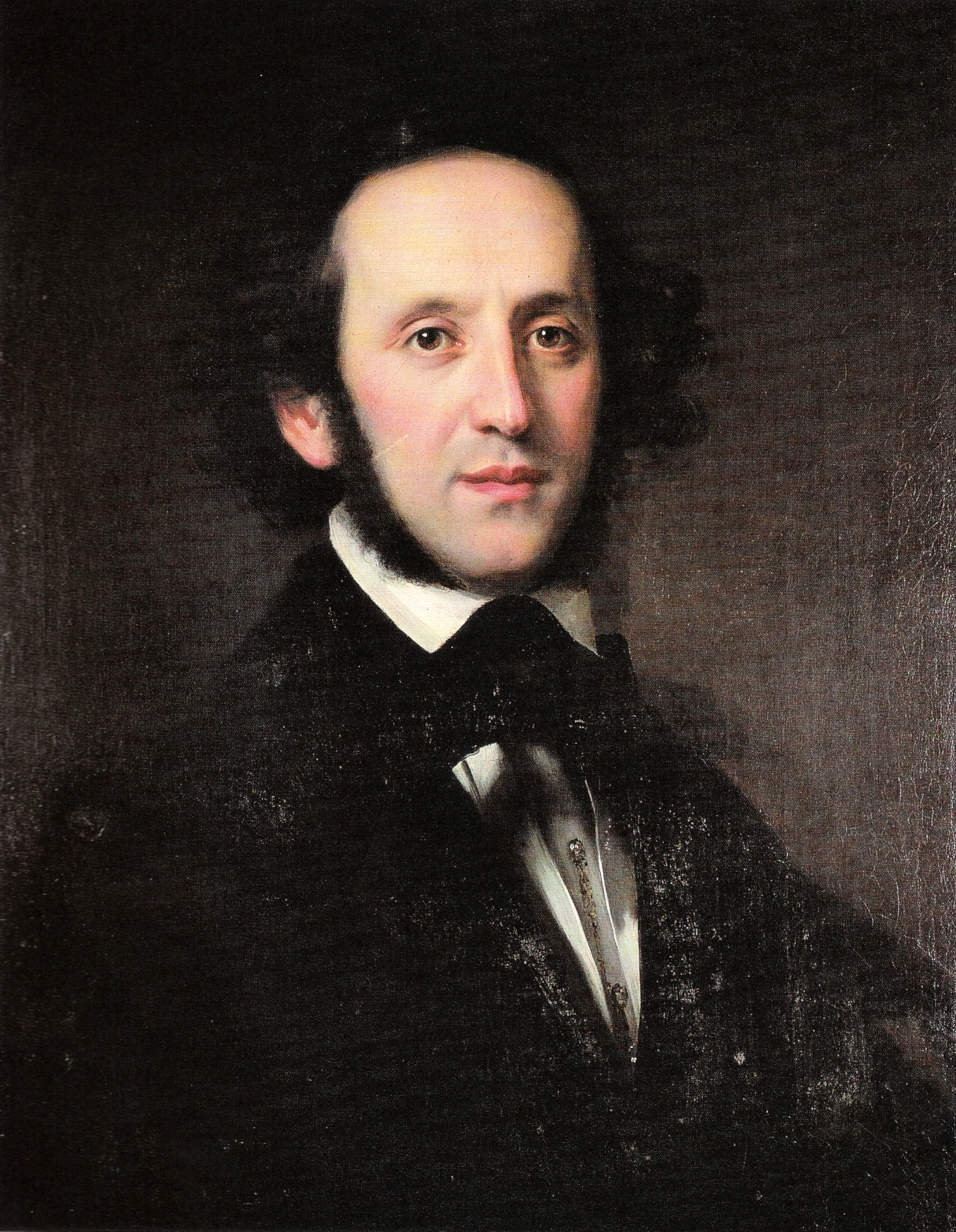
- The composer in 1846, portrait by Eduard Magnus
- English: Six songs
- Opus: 59
- Text: Poems by; Helmina von Chézy; Johann Wolfgang von Goethe; Joseph von Eichendorff; Ludwig Uhland
- Language: German
- Composed: 1837–43
- Published: 1882–84
- Scoring: SATB

Sechs Lieder (Six songs), Op. 59, is a collection of six part songs for four voices, a cappella by Felix Mendelssohn. He composed the songs between 1837 and 1843, setting six poems in German. They are subtitled "Im Freien zu singen" ("To be sung outdoors") and focus on nature. They were published after his death as part of his complete works. One of the songs, "O Täler weit, o Höhen" became so popular that it is also regarded as Volkslied.

== History ==
When Mendelssohn studied in Berlin with Carl Friedrich Zelter, he was introduced to the lieder of Zelter, Ludwig Berger, Johann Friedrich Reichardt and Bernhard Klein, who have become known to musicologists as the Zweite Berliner Liederschule ("Second Berlin Song School"). (Note: The "First Berlin Song School" is associated with Frederick the Great and includes the composers Johann Joachim Quantz, Carl Philipp Emanuel Bach and Franz Benda.) Their concepts included simple strophic form and singable melodies, trying to convey the characteristic moods of the poems which they set. Mendelssohn followed these ideas, which were also promoted by Goethe, in his songs.

Mendelssohn composed his songs for four mixed voices during the summer months which he spent with his family in Frankfurt or on his uncle's winery in Horchheim. He composed three sets "lm Freien zu singen" of six songs each, Op. 41 in 1834, Op. 48 in 1839, and Op. 59 in 1837 to 1843. Ten further songs were published as Op. 88 and Op. 100. All appeared as part of his complete works by Breitkopf & Härtel in 1882–84.

The third of the songs, Abschied vom Walde (Farewell to the Forest), beginning "O Täler weit, o Höhen" (O valleys wide, o height) became especially popular, and has been regarded as a Volkslied.

== Structure ==
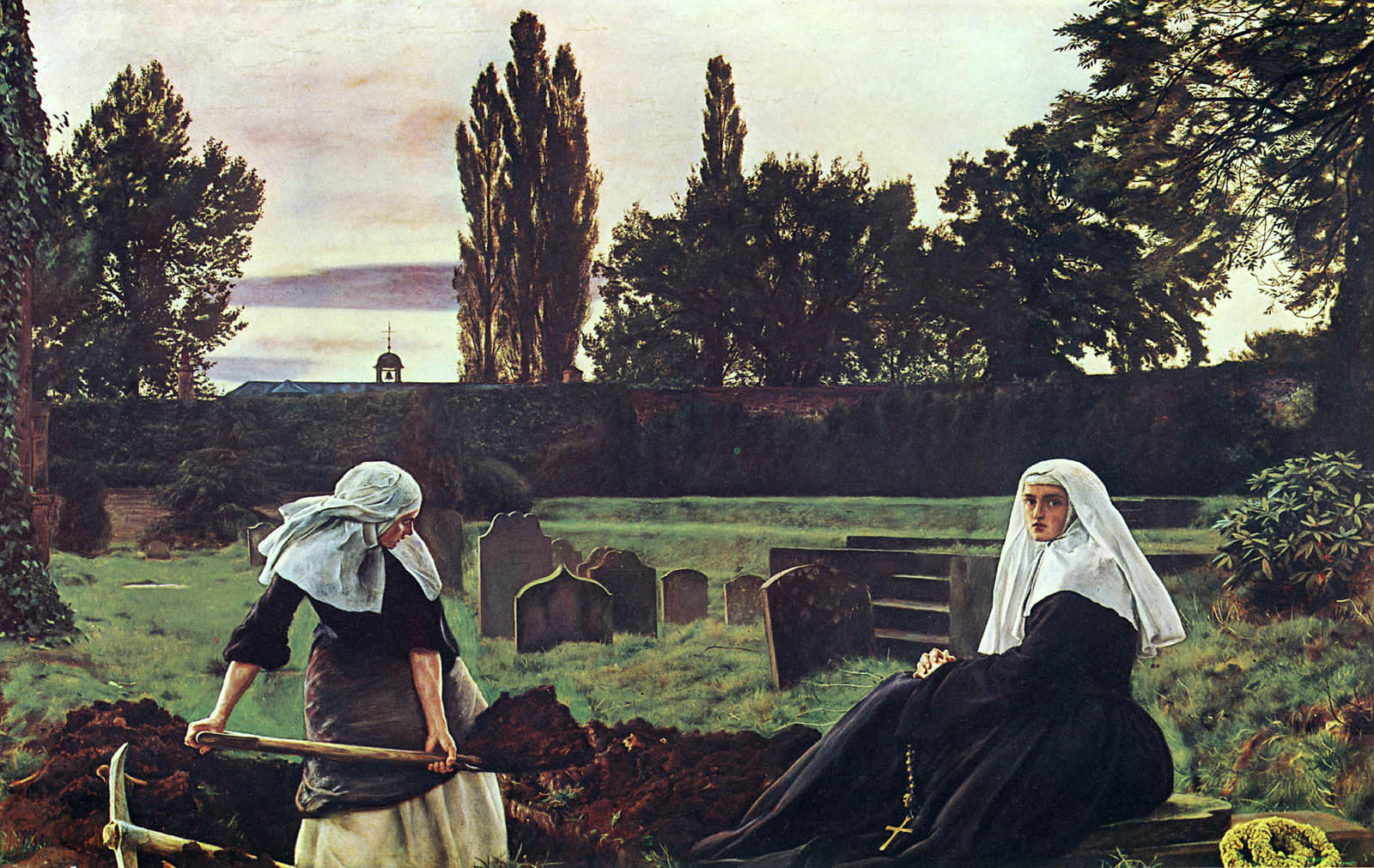
The Vale of Rest by John Everett Millais (1858–59). The title and subtitle of the painting, "Where the weary find repose", were inspired by 'Ruhetal'.

The titles of the six songs, Op. 59 are:

1. Im Grünen (in the Green)
2. Frühzeitiger Frühling (Early Spring)
3. Abschied vom Walde (Farewell to the forest)
4. Die Nachtigall (The nightingale)
5. Ruhetal (Restful valley)
6. Jagdlied (Chase song)

The poems were written by Helmina von Chézy (1), Johann Wolfgang von Goethe (2, 4), Joseph von Eichendorff (3, 6), and Ludwig Uhland (5), treated with freedom at times. Their themes are often Spring and Nature. Mendelssohn expanded some songs by a coda, others are through-composed. No. 3, "Abschied vom Walde", is in simple strophic form but uses imitation of the voices in the third line.

== Recordings ==
In 2010, the title Abschied vom Walde of the third song, was taken for a recording of part-songs by Mendelssohn and his sister Fanny Hensel, performed by the Vocal Concert Dresden. All Mendelssohn's songs Im Freien zu singen were recorded in 2017 by the Kammerchor Stuttgart, conducted by Frieder Bernius, awarded the Preis der deutschen Schallplattenkritik.
