= The Vale of Rest =

Painting by John Everett Millais

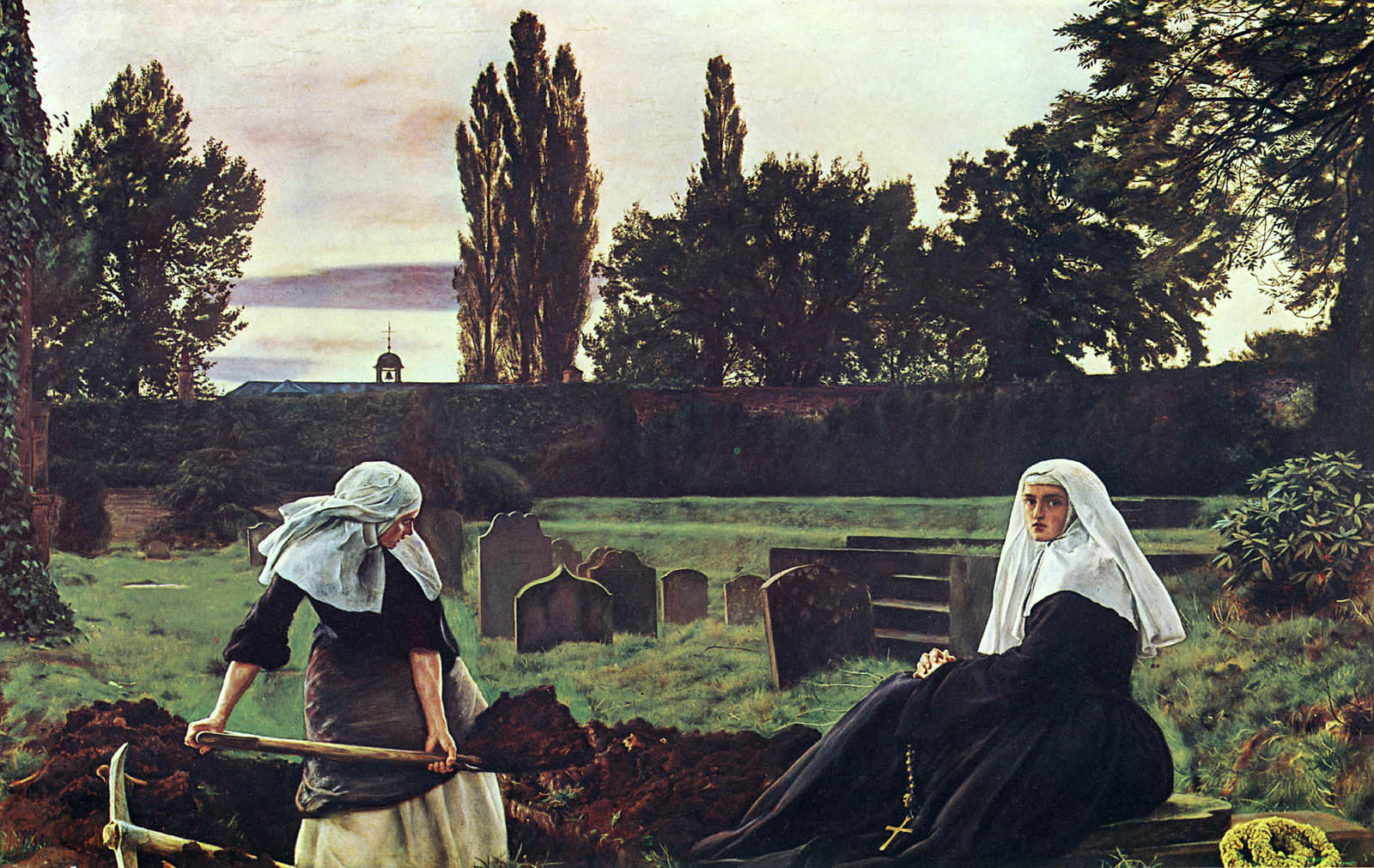
- Artist: John Everett Millais
- Year: 1858–59
- Medium: oil on canvas
- Dimensions: 102.9 cm × 172.7 cm (40.5 in × 68.0 in)
- Location: Tate Britain, London

The Vale of Rest (1858–59) is a painting by the English Pre-Raphaelite artist John Everett Millais. It depicts a twilight graveyard scene and prominently features two nuns. Of all the paintings that Millais produced, this was his favourite. It was conceived as a pendant (companion piece) to Spring (1856–59).

== Subject ==
The painting is of a graveyard, as the sun is setting. Beyond the graveyard wall there is a low chapel with a bell. In the foreground of the scene, there are two nuns – the heads of the two nuns are level and symmetrical. One of the nuns sits, a rosary with a skull attached hanging from her robes, and looks directly at the viewer. Funerary wreaths lie beside her. The other nun digs a grave, her forearms and body straining under the weight of a shovelful of earth, her habit moving with the effort of throwing the soil. The painting's heavy symbolism of death invites the viewer "to contemplate our own mortality".

The idea for the painting came to Millais on his honeymoon in Scotland in 1855. Millais' wife, Effie, commented

"On descending the hill by Loch Awe, from Inverary, he was extremely struck with its beauty, and the coachman told us that on one of the islands were the ruins of a monastery. We imagined to ourselves the beauty of the picturesque features of the Roman Catholic religion".

Millais started work on the painting at the end of October 1858, inspired by a beautiful sunset. For several days he painted en plein air in the garden of Effie's family home at Bowerswell, Perth. She recalled:

"The sunsets were lovely for two or three nights, and he dashed the work in, softening it afterwards in the house, making it, I thought, even less purple and gold than when he saw it in the sky. The effect lasted so short a time that he had to paint like lightning".

The setting - shrubs, wall and background - are from the Gray family garden, while the gravestones were painted some months later, at Kinnoull old churchyard in Perth. Many years later Effie was to be buried in this churchyard. In December 1858 Millais was working on the figures.

Both the picture's title and subtitle, "Where the weary find repose", are from Mendelssohn's part-song 'Ruhetal' ("Restful valley") from Sechs Lieder, Opus 59, no. 5. Millais heard his brother William singing the song, and felt it exactly captured the atmosphere of the picture.

After its exhibition at the Royal Academy in 1859, Millais retouched the face of the sitting nun, using a Miss Paton as the model. Later he had the painting in his studio for a week in 1862 to repaint the face again, using a Miss Lane as the model.

== Reception ==
Art critic Tom Lubbock said of the painting:

Graves. Dusk. A walled enclosure. The spooky, looming trees. Nuns. Catholics (in England then, still an object of suspicion). Sexual segregation. Religiosity. Mistress and servant, a power relationship, maybe some deeper emotional bondage. Female labour. Something being buried or exhumed. Twin wreaths. The deep dark earth. Corpses, secrets, conspiracy, fear. It's a picture that pulls out all the stops.

The painting is one of those satirised in Florence Claxton's watercolour The Choice of Paris – an idyll (1860). Claxton criticized "the perceived ugliness of early pre-Raphaelite paintings by exaggerating details from many of their works, including The Vale of Rest, Claudio and Isabella, and, lying in the grass, Alice Gray from Spring".

== Exhibition and ownership ==
In 1859 the painting was privately exhibited at the Langham Chambers, before being exhibited at the Royal Academy Exhibition of 1859, alongside Millais' Spring (1856–59). Millais did not manage to sell the painting at the exhibition, and he later sold it to dealer D. T. White on behalf of the collector of Pre-Raphaelite art, B. G. Windus, for £7,000, far less than the £10,000 he had hoped for.

The painting was presented to the Tate Gallery in 1894 by Sir Henry Tate. The painting hung in a special Winter Exhibition at the Royal Academy, London, held between January and March 1898, which featured many collected works of the late Millais (catalogue number 9).

== See also ==
- List of paintings by John Everett Millais
