= James Forsyth (sculptor) =

Scottish sculptor

James Forsyth (1827–1910) was a Scottish sculptor, best remembered for various fountains designed for William Ward, 1st Earl of Dudley (1817–1885) at Witley Court, Worcestershire, England, and in the town of Dudley. He was born in Kelso, Scotland, a son of Adam Forsyth, a mason.

== Notable works ==
=== Fountains, Witley Court ===
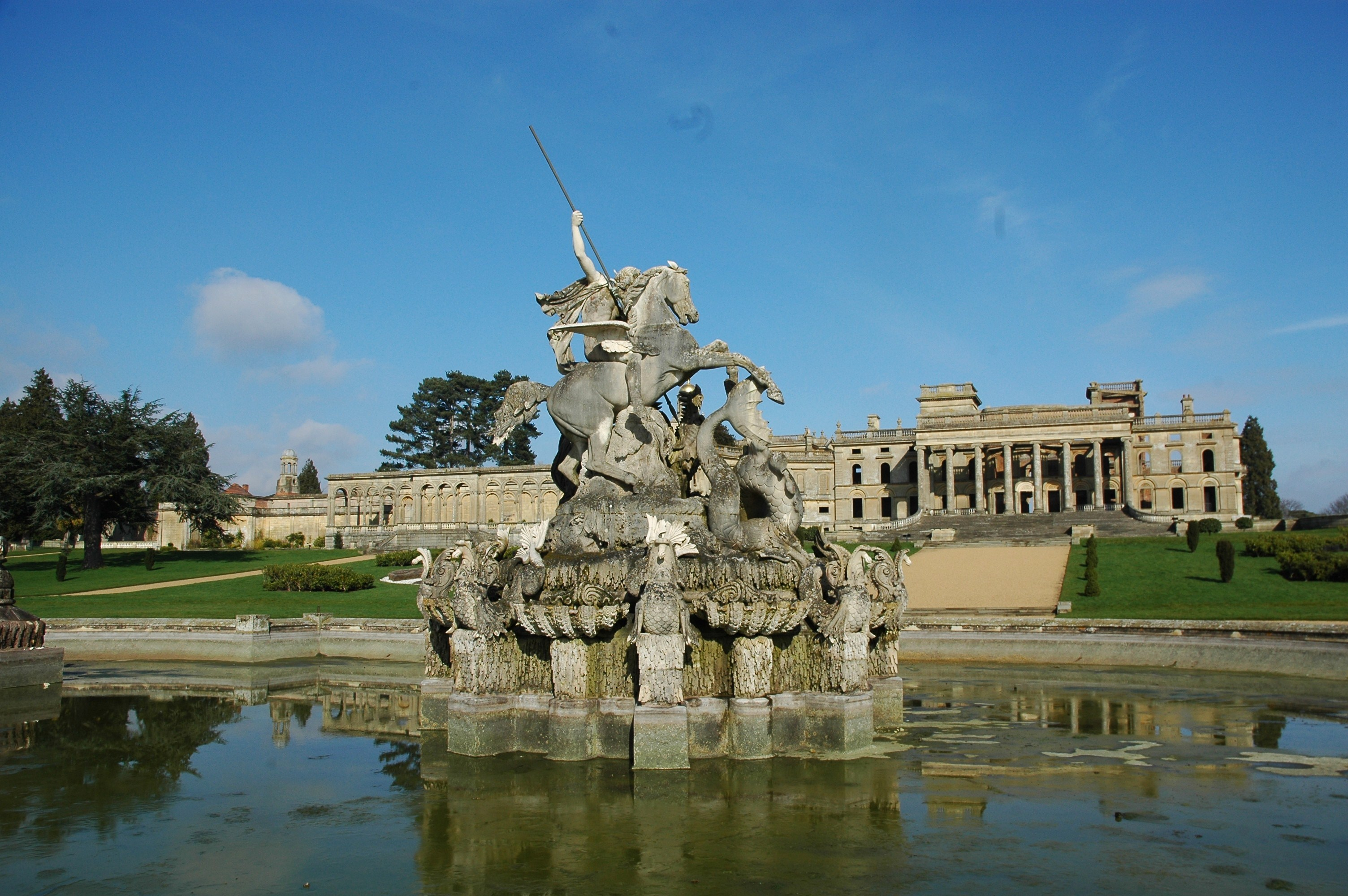
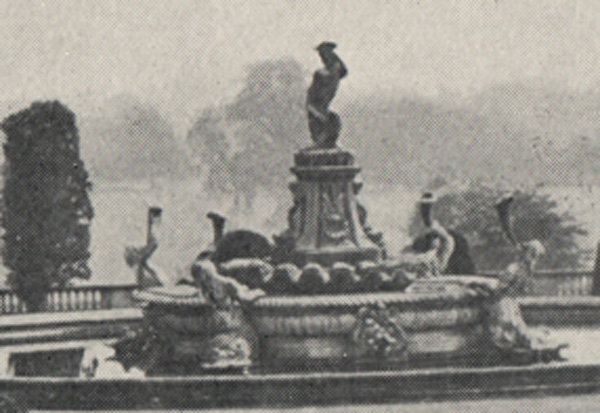
Fountains at Witley Court: Left: Perseus and Andromeda fountain (1858); right: Flora fountain (1857-9)

Two immense fountains at Witley Court were designed by William Andrew Nesfield and executed by James Forsyth from his London based workshop. They survived the fire and subsequent despoliation of the house. The largest, the Perseus and Andromeda Fountain, has been restored to working order by English Heritage.

=== Triumphal Arch Fountain, Dudley ===
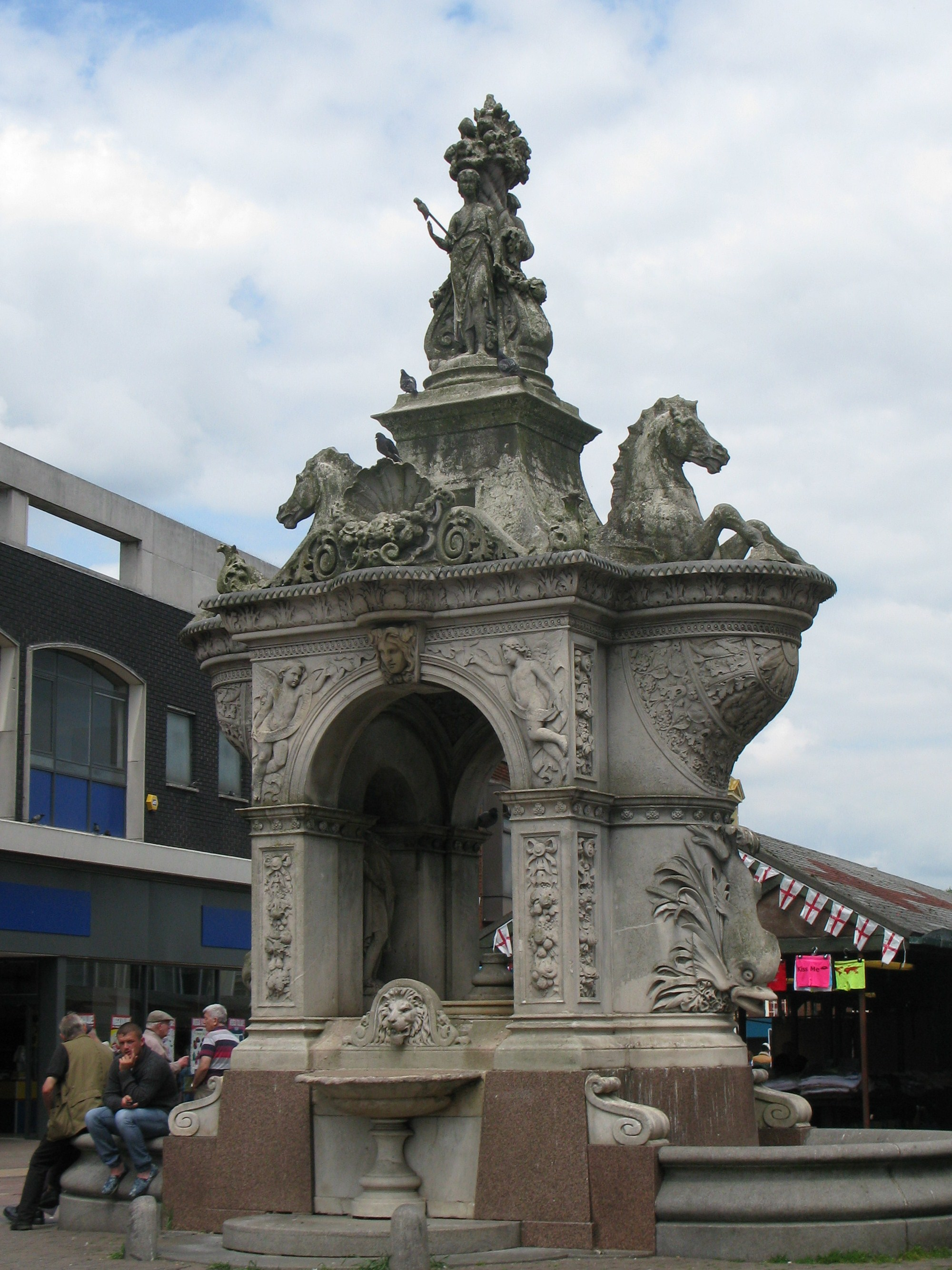
Fountain, Dudley market place

A Grade II structure designed by James Forsyth in 1867 and presented to the town of Dudley by the 1st Earl of Dudley. A triumphal arch ornamented with sculpture in the Flamboyant Italian Renaissance style, including heraldic dolphins and heraldic demi-sea horses, topped with female figure below a large cornucopia.

== Family ==
He is the father of James Nesfield Forsyth (1864-1942) a noted sculptor.

== Sources ==
- James Forsyth
