= Romilly (surname) =

Romilly is a surname, and may refer to:

- Charles Romilly (1808–1887), English cricketer and barrister
- Edward Romilly (1804–1870), English amateur cricketer and MP
- Esmond Romilly (1918–1941), English socialist and anti-fascist, married to Jessica Mitford
- Frederick Romilly (1810–1887), a British Whig politician and cricketer
- Giles Romilly (1916–1967), English journalist, Nazi POW
- Hugh Hastings Romilly (1856–1892), English explorer in the Pacific
- Jean Romilly (1714–1796), Genevan watchmaker, journalist and encyclopédiste
- Jean-Edme Romilly (1739 or 40–1779), Genevan theologian and encyclopédiste, son of Jean Romilly
- Jacqueline de Romilly (1913–2010), French philologist
- John Romilly, 1st Baron Romilly (1802–1874), English judge
- John Romilly, 3rd Baron Romilly (1866–1905), British hereditary peer and soldier
- Joseph Romilly (1791–1864), English academic administrator
- Sir Samuel Romilly (1757–1818), English legal reformer, MP for Westminster
- William Romilly, 4th Baron Romilly (1899–1983), British hereditary peer
