= Baron Romilly =

Extinct barony in the Peerage of the United Kingdom

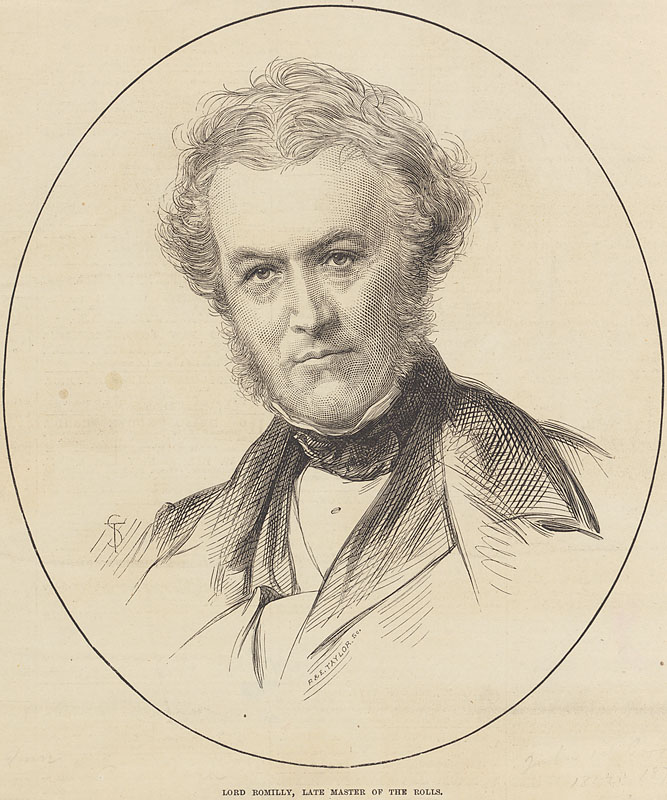
John Romilly, 1st Baron Romilly.

Baron Romilly, of Barry in the County of Glamorgan, was a title in the Peerage of the United Kingdom. It was created on 3 January 1866 for Sir John Romilly, the Master of the Rolls and former Solicitor General and Attorney General. He was the second son of the legal reformer Sir Samuel Romilly. The Romilly family were of French Huguenot descent.

Lord Romilly's great-grandson, the fourth Baron (the title having descended from father to son), was a member of the Marlborough cum Ramsbury Rural District Council for many years and served as its chairman from 1964 to 1967. He was childless and on his death on 29 June 1983 the title became extinct.

Frederick Romilly, brother of the first Baron, sat as Member of Parliament for Canterbury.

== Barons Romilly (1866) ==
- John Romilly, 1st Baron Romilly (1802–1874)
- William Romilly, 2nd Baron Romilly (1835–1891)
- John Gaspard le Marchant Romilly, 3rd Baron Romilly (1866–1905)
- William Gaspard Guy Romilly, 4th Baron Romilly (1899–1983)

== Arms ==
Coat of arms of Baron Romilly
| Crest Upon a rock Proper a crescent Argent. Escutcheon Argent in base a rock with nine points issuant from each a lily all Proper on a chief Azure a crescent between two mullets of the first. Supporters On either side a greyhound Argent gorged with a collar fleury counterfleury Azure and charged on the shoulder with a lily slipped Proper. Motto Persevere |
