= William Humble Ward, 10th Baron Ward =

The Right Honourable William Humble Ward

Personal details
- Born: William Humble Ward; 1781
- Died: 6 December 1835 (aged 53–54)
- Spouse: Amelia Pillans
- Children: 3, including William Ward, 1st Earl of Dudley
- Parent(s): Humble Ward; Susannah Beecroft

William Humble Ward, 10th Baron Ward (1781 – 6 December 1835) was a clergyman who succeeded to the Ward Barony.

== Early life ==
He was the son of Humble Ward and wife Susannah Beecroft. His paternal grandparents were the Rev. William Ward (younger brother of the 1st Viscount Dudley and Ward, both sons of William Ward and grandsons of Hon. William Ward, himself a younger son of the 1st Baron Ward) and Elizabeth Hawkes.

He was educated at Eton College before attending Queens' College, Cambridge.

== Career ==
A clergyman in the Church of England, Ward served as rector at Himley, Staffordshire, before succeeding his second cousin John Ward as the 10th Baron Ward of Birmingham on 6 March 1833.

== Personal life ==
On 22 May 1816, Ward married Amelia Pillans (c. 1797–1882), a daughter of William Gooch Pillans, Esq. of Bracondale, Norfolk. Together, they were the parents of:

- William Ward, 1st Earl of Dudley (1817–1885), who married Selina Constance de Burgh, daughter of Hubert de Burgh, in 1851. After her death that same year, he married Georgina Elisabeth Moncreiffe, daughter of Sir Thomas Moncreiffe, 7th Baronet and Lady Louisa Hay-Drummond (a daughter of the 11th Earl of Kinnoull), in 1865.
- Hon. Humble Dudley Ward (1821–1870), who Eleanor Louisa Hawkes, daughter of Thomas Hawkes, MP for Dudley, in 1843.
- Hon. Julia Susannah Ward (d. 1902), who married Rt. Rev. Thomas Legh Claughton, Bishop of St Albans, a son of Thomas Claughton, MP for Newton, in 1842.

Lord Ward died on 6 December 1835. His widow, the dowager Baroness Ward, died on 23 May 1882.

=== Descendants ===
Through his son Humble, he was a grandfather of Amelia Alice Julia Ward (wife of Lt.-Gen. James Keith Fraser, son of Lt.-Col. Sir James Fraser, 3rd Baronet, and parents of Sir Keith Fraser, 5th Baronet), Henrietta Maria Ward (wife of George Stewart Forbes, a son of Sir Charles Forbes, 3rd Baronet), and William Humble Dudley Ward (who married Hon. Eugenie Brett, a daughter of the 1st Viscount Esher, parents of William Dudley Ward).

Through his daughter Julia, he was a grandfather of Gilbert Henry Claughton (1856–1921), who was created a baronet of The Priory in the Parish of Dudley, in 1912, and Amelia Maria Claughton (wife of Lt.-Col. Hon. Augustus Anson, a son of the 1st Earl of Lichfield, and after his death, George Campbell, 8th Duke of Argyll).

Peerage of England
Preceded by John Ward	Baron Ward; 1833–1835	Succeeded by William Ward
