= William Romilly, 4th Baron Romilly =

British peer (1899–1983)

The Right Honourable The Lord Romilly

Member of the House of Lords Lord Temporal
- In office 4 August 1920 – 29 June 1983; Hereditary Peerage
- Preceded by: John Romilly, 3rd Baron Romilly
- Succeeded by: Extinct

Personal details
- Born: 8 March 1899
- Died: 29 June 1983 (aged 84)
- Party: Conservative
- Spouses: Hon. Diana Joan Sackville-West (m. 1929; div. 1944) Dora Sybil Morris (m. 1944; died 1960) Marion Elizabeth Jessie Cecil (m. 1966)
- Relations: Sir Philip Grey Egerton, 12th Baronet (uncle)
- Parent(s): John Romilly, 3rd Baron Romilly; Violet Edith Grey-Egerton

William Gaspard Guy Romilly, 4th Baron Romilly (8 March 1899 – 29 June 1983) was a British hereditary peer.

== Early life ==
He was the only child of John Romilly, 3rd Baron Romilly and the former Violet Edith Grey-Egerton.

Of Huguenot ancestry from Montpellier, his paternal grandparents were William Romilly, 2nd Baron Romilly and, his first wife, the former Emily Idonea Sophia Le Marchant (eldest daughter of Lt.-Gen. Sir John Gaspard Le Marchant). His mother was the only daughter of Sir Philip Grey-Egerton, 11th Baronet of Oulton Park and the Hon. Henrietta Elizabeth Sophia Denison (eldest daughter of Albert Denison, 1st Baron Londesborough). His maternal uncle was Sir Philip Grey Egerton, 12th Baronet. He was educated at Ludgrove School.

== Career ==
Upon his father's early death on 23 June 1905, William inherited the barony at just six years old.

Romilly was a veteran of the First World War, serving from 1918 to 1919 and a Lieutenant in the Coldstream Guards from 1919 to 1923. During World War II, he became a Major of the Reserve of Officers.

== Personal life ==
On 3 December 1929, he was married to Hon. Diana Joan Sackville-West, the only daughter of Charles Sackville-West, 4th Baron Sackville and the former Maude Cecilia Bell (eldest daughter of Capt. Matthew John Bell of Bourne Park). They divorced in 1944 and she married, as his third wife, Lt.-Col. Sir Douglas Hall, 2nd Baronet, in January 1951.

On 19 December 1944, he married secondly to Dora Sybil Morris, a daughter of Reginald Morris of London. They remained married until her death on 24 April 1960. Lord Romilly set up the Dora, Lady Romilly, Fund in her memory in 1962.

His third marriage was on 18 July 1966 to Marion Elizabeth Jessie (née Clover) Cecil, a daughter of Charles M. Clover of Pilgrim's Way, Blewbury. She was the former wife of Geoffrey Adams and Capt. Lionel Cecil.

Although Lord Romilly married three times, he remained childless and upon his death on 29 June 1983 the barony became extinct. After his death, his widow Lady Romilly remarried, as his second wife, to Col. Edward John Sutton Ward (a son of Jean Templeton Ward and Sir John Hubert Ward) in 1986.

== Arms ==
Coat of arms of William Romilly, 4th Baron Romilly
Crest Upon a rock Proper a crescent Argent. Escutcheon Argent in base a rock with nine points issuant from each a lily all Proper on a chief Azure a crescent between two mullets of the first. Supporters On either side a greyhound Argent gorged with a collar fleury counterfleury Azure and charged on the shoulder with a lily slipped Proper. Motto Persevere

Peerage of the United Kingdom
Preceded by John Romilly	Baron Romilly; 1905–1983	Extinct
