= Adolph von Ernsthausen =

English cricketer

Adolph Christian Ernest von Ernsthausen (17 October 1880 – 29 May 1928) was an English first-class cricketer active 1900–04 who played for Surrey and Oxford University. He was born in Hampstead; died in Surrey.
