= Dudley House, London =

House at 100 Park Lane, London

Coordinates: 51°30′38″N 0°09′24″W

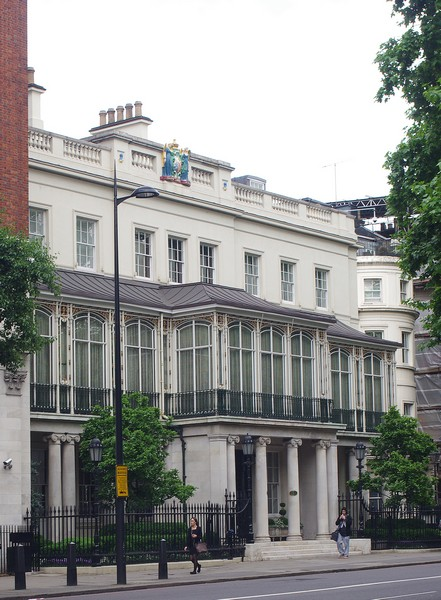
Dudley House in 2015

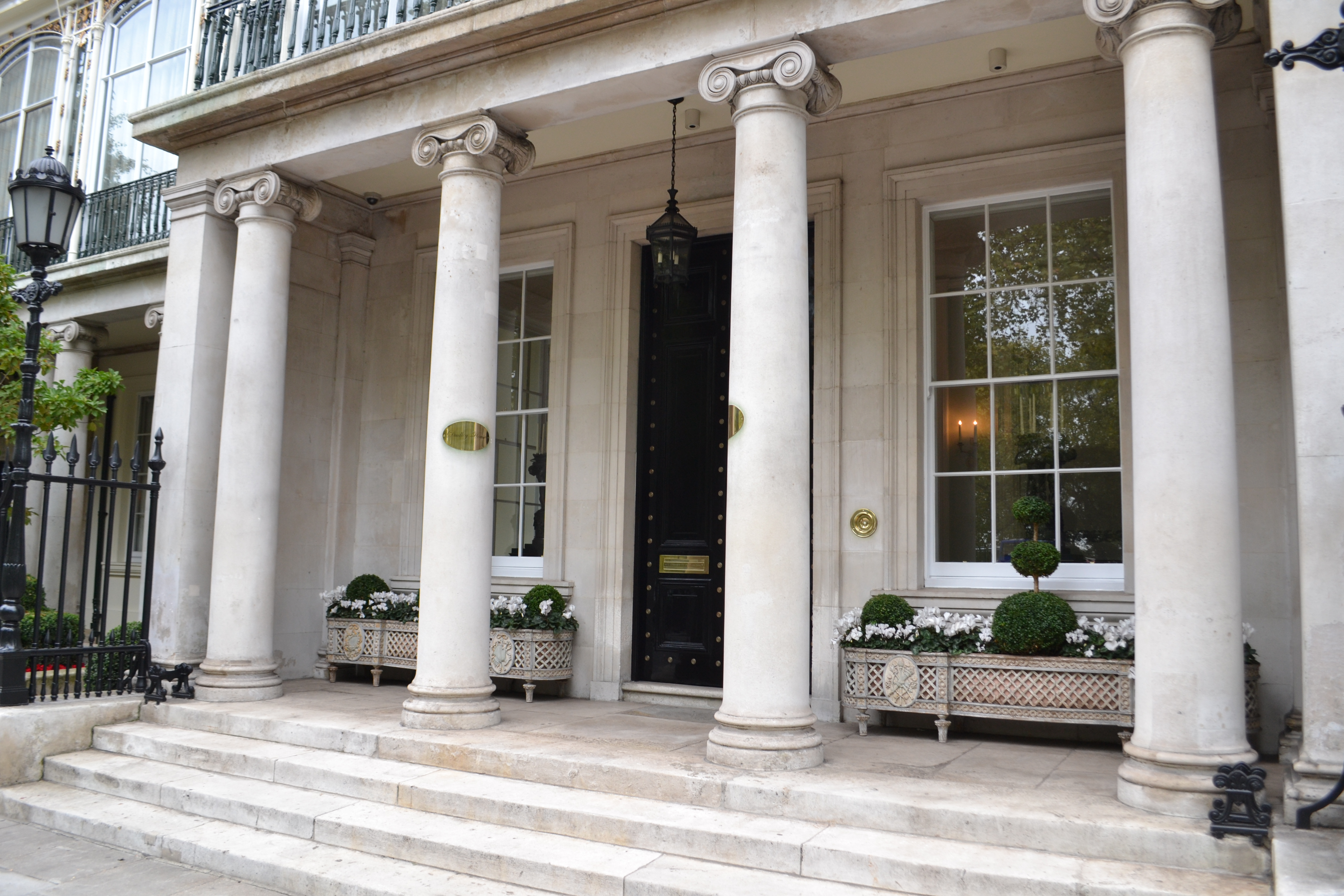
The portico of Dudley House

Dudley House is a Grade II* listed house with 44,000 square feet (4,100 m^{2}) located at 100 Park Lane in the Mayfair area of London, England. It is one of the few surviving aristocratic townhouses in London. Dudley House is named after the Ward family, holders of the titles of Baron Ward, Viscount Dudley and Ward, and Earl of Dudley.

== History ==
An earlier house with stabling on the site was acquired in 1742 by the 6th Baron Ward. In 1759, William Ward, 3rd Viscount Dudley and Ward undertook substantial alterations to the property. Between 1827 and 1829, John Ward, 1st Earl of Dudley, rebuilt the house to the plans of the architect William Atkinson. The Earl died childless and insane in 1833, and the house was leased to Francis Conyngham, 2nd Marquess Conyngham and then to James Hamilton, 2nd Marquess of Abercorn.

In 1847, the Earl's cousin, William Ward, 11th Lord Ward, took over the house and remained there until his death in 1885, by which time he had become the 1st Earl of Dudley, of the second creation. In 1855, he commissioned alterations from architect Samuel Whitfield Daukes that were most impressive, including an 81 ft picture gallery and a 50 ft ballroom. After inheriting from his father, William Ward, 2nd Earl of Dudley extended the conservatory over the porch.

In 1895, the house was sold to Sir Joseph Robinson, 1st Baronet, a South African mining magnate. Robinson frequently used the house for entertaining, hosting performances by singers Nellie Melba and Clara Butt at the house. In 1912, Sir John Hubert Ward bought the building back for 10,000 pounds, and remained there until his death in 1938.

Dudley House was severely damaged in the Blitz during World War II, and the property reverted into the possession of the Grosvenor Estate. It became a temporary office, before it began to deteriorate into a near ruin. Hammerson, a British property development and investment company, converted the house into offices, to designs by architects Sir Basil Spence and Anthony Blee in 1969–70. The architects remained sympathetic to Dudley House's historic interiors, but the rear of the house was completely reconstructed, the war-damaged ballroom and picture gallery disappearing, with only sections of the ceiling of the latter surviving under a false-ceiling. The house remained as offices for sixty years before its reversion to a private residence.

In 2004, Hammerson appointed Formation Architects (then the Halpern Partnership) to obtain planning permission for change of use from an office to residential use as a single family dwelling.

In 2006, Hammerson and the freeholder, the Grosvenor Estate, sold the leasehold for £37.4 million to Bristol Isles Ltd., a private investment company controlled by the Emir of Qatar. The house was subject to a major refurbishment to the designs of Formation Architects with interior decoration by Alberto Pinto, and restoration which included a rebuilding of the historic picture gallery and ballroom. The house is now the London residence of Sheikh Hamad bin Abdullah Al Thani, son of Sheikh Abdullah bin Khalifa Al Thani, a brother of the former Emir of Qatar, and first cousin of the current emir, Sheikh Tamim bin Hamad Al Thani.

A 2015 Vanity Fair magazine profile of the house described it as London's most valuable private residence, at about $400 million, and that Queen Elizabeth II, a visitor, had supposedly said that the house "...makes Buckingham Palace look rather dull".

Soon after the article was published, Westminster City Council rejected a Qatari planning application to combine two mansions on Cornwall Terrace in Regent's Park to create a 17-bedroom palace. The Guardian alleged that the previous publicity had caused concern among the ruling family of Qatar, quoting a source as saying that Qatar was seen as "very bling" with a view that this "...needs to be brought under control."

Together with Lancaster House, Bridgewater House, Apsley House, Sunderland House (now Lombard House) and Spencer House, Dudley House is an outstanding surviving example of the grand townhouses that once adorned central London. Dudley House and Stanhope House are the only two left of the original ten mansions that lined Park Lane in 1900.

== Bibliography ==
- Stourton, James (2012). Great Houses of London. London: Frances Lincoln. ISBN 978-0-7112-3366-9.
