= Thomas Marlow =

English cricketer

Personal information
- Full name: Thomas Marlow
- Born: 15 December 1878; Anstey, Leicestershire, England
- Died: 13 August 1954 (aged 75); Leicester, Leicestershire, England
- Batting: Left-handed
- Bowling: Left-arm slow-medium

Domestic team information
- Years: Team
- 1900–1903: Leicestershire

Career statistics
Competition	First-class
Matches	15
Runs scored	46
Batting average	3.28
100s/50s	–/–
Top score	10*
Balls bowled	1,855
Wickets	31
Bowling average	27.29
5 wickets in innings	2
10 wickets in match	–
Best bowling	6/50
Catches/stumpings	7/–
- Source: Cricinfo, 5 February 2013

Thomas Marlow (15 December 1878 – 13 August 1954) was an English cricketer. Marlow was a left-handed batsman who bowled left-arm slow-medium. He was born at Anstey, Leicestershire.

Marlow joined the Leicestershire ground staff in 1898, and initially played in the second team. He made his first-class debut against Sussex in the 1900 County Championship at Grace Road. Marlow made fourteen further first-class appearances for the county, the last of which came against Essex in the 1903 County Championship. In his total of fifteen first-class matches, he took 31 wickets at an average of 27.29, with best figures of 6/50. One of two five wicket hauls he took, his best figures came against Hampshire in the 1902 County Championship. A poor tailend batsman, Marlow scored 46 runs at a batting average of 3.28.

He died at Leicester, Leicestershire on 13 August 1954.
