= John Romilly, 3rd Baron Romilly =

The Right Honourable The Lord Romilly

Personal details
- Born: John Gaspard Le Marchant Romilly; 1 March 1866
- Died: 23 June 1905 (aged 39)
- Spouse: Violet Edith Grey-Egerton (m. 1897)
- Relations: John Romilly, 1st Baron Romilly (grandfather); Sir John Le Marchant (grandfather)
- Parent(s): William Romilly, 2nd Baron Romilly; Emily Idonea Sophia Le Marchant

Military service
- Branch/service: Coldstream Guards; Reserve of Officers
- Rank: Major
- Battles/wars: Second Boer War

John Gaspard Le Marchant Romilly, 3rd Baron Romilly (1 March 1866 – 23 June 1905) was a British hereditary peer and soldier.

== Early life ==
Romilly was born on 1 March 1866. Of Huguenot ancestry from Montpellier, he was the only child of William Romilly, 2nd Baron Romilly and, his first wife, the former Emily Idonea Sophia Le Marchant. After his mother's death two weeks after his birth in 1866, his father remarried to Helen Denison (the eldest daughter of Edward Hanson Denison of Rusholme near Manchester) on 6 November 1872. In May 1891, his father and two servants died from smoke inhalation from a fire at his London residence.

His paternal grandparents were the former Caroline Charlotte Otter (second daughter of Rt. Rev. William Otter, Bishop of Chichester) and the English Whig politician John Romilly, 1st Baron Romilly who served in Lord John Russell's first administration as Solicitor General and later as Attorney General. He was the second son of Sir Samuel Romilly, MP, and the older brother of Frederick Romilly, MP. His maternal grandparents were the former Margaret Anne Taylor (third daughter of Rev. Robert Taylor of Clifton Campville) and Lt.-Gen. Sir John Gaspard Le Marchant, who served as Governor of Newfoundland, Lieutenant Governor of Nova Scotia, and Governor of Malta. His grandfather was the son of Maj.-Gen. John Le Marchant and the younger brother of Sir Denis Le Marchant, 1st Baronet.

== Career ==
Following his father's death in May 1891, he succeeded as the 3rd Baron Romilly.

From 1886 to 1888, he was a Lieutenant in the King's Royal Rifles, followed by a Captain of the Coldstream Guards in 1898. In 1900, he was made Captain of the Reserve of Officers and served in Second Boer War before being made a Major of the Reserve of Officers.

== Personal life ==
On 3 August 1897, Lord Romilly was married to Violet Edith Grey-Egerton (1870–1906) in London. She was the only daughter of Sir Philip Grey-Egerton, 11th Baronet of Oulton Park and the former Hon. Henrietta Elizabeth Sophia Denison (eldest daughter of Albert Denison, 1st Baron Londesborough). Together, they were the parents of one son:

- William Gaspard Guy Romilly, 4th Baron Romilly (1899–1983), who married Hon. Diana Joan Sackville-West, the only daughter of Charles Sackville-West, 4th Baron Sackville, in 1929. They divorced in 1944 and he married Dora Sybil Morris, a daughter of Reginald Morris, that same year. After her death in 1960, he married Marion Elizabeth Jessie (née Clover) Cecil, a daughter of Charles M. Clover, in 1966.

Lord Romilly died on 23 June 1905 and was succeeded by his only son William, upon whose death in 1983 the barony became extinct. His widow died less than a year later on 1 March 1906.

== Arms ==
Coat of arms of John Romilly, 3rd Baron Romilly
Crest Upon a rock Proper a crescent Argent. Escutcheon Argent in base a rock with nine points issuant from each a lily all Proper on a chief Azure a crescent between two mullets of the first. Supporters On either side a greyhound Argent gorged with a collar fleury counterfleury Azure and charged on the shoulder with a lily slipped Proper. Motto Persevere

Peerage of the United Kingdom
Preceded by William Romilly	Baron Romilly; 1891–1905	Succeeded by William Gaspard Guy Romilly
