= William Ward, 2nd Earl of Dudley =

British aristocrat, politician and military officer

The Right Honourable The Earl of Dudley GCB, GCMG, GCVO, KStJ, TD, PC
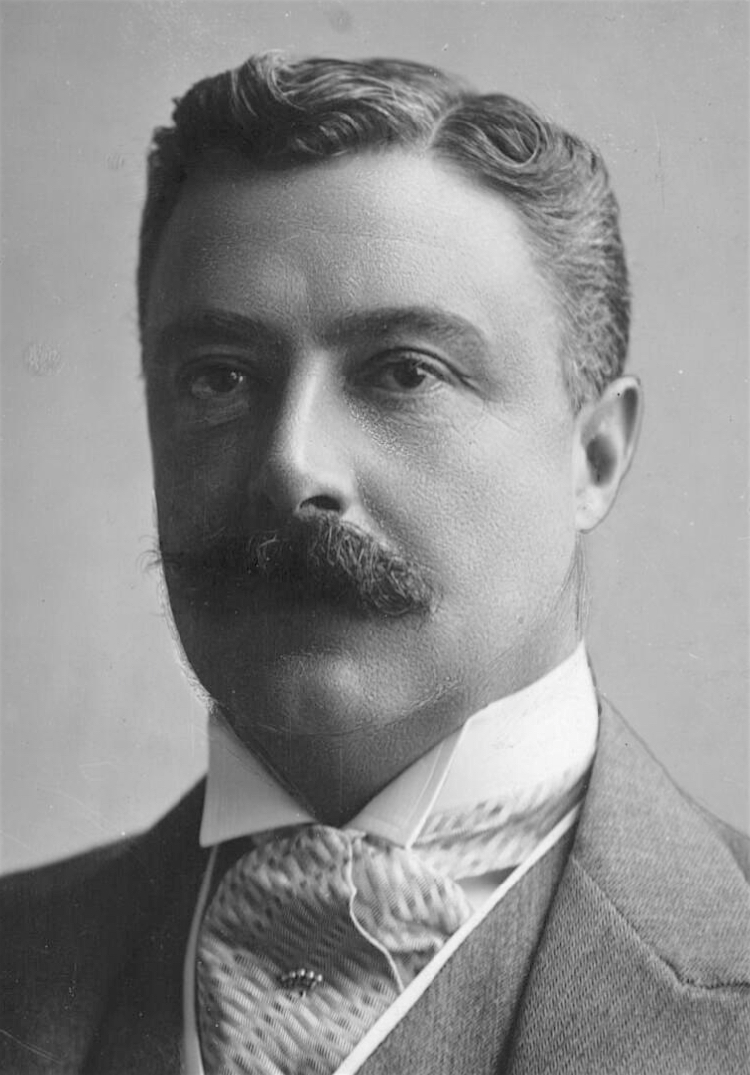
- Ward c. 1900s

4th Governor-General of Australia
- In office 9 September 1908 – 31 July 1911
- Monarchs: Edward VII; George V
- Prime Minister: Alfred Deakin; Andrew Fisher
- Preceded by: The Lord Northcote
- Succeeded by: The Lord Denman

Lord Lieutenant of Ireland
- In office 11 August 1902 – 11 December 1905
- Monarch: Edward VII
- Prime Minister: Arthur Balfour
- Preceded by: The Earl Cadogan
- Succeeded by: The Earl of Aberdeen

Parliamentary Secretary to the Board of Trade
- In office 21 June 1895 – 11 July 1902
- Prime Minister: The Marquess of Salisbury
- Preceded by: Thomas Burt
- Succeeded by: Bonar Law

Personal details
- Born: 25 May 1867 London, England
- Died: 29 June 1932 (aged 65) London, England
- Party: Conservative
- Spouses: Rachel Gurney (m. 1891; died 1920) Gertie Millar (m. 1924)
- Children: 7, including William and George
- Parent(s): William Ward, 1st Earl of Dudley; Georgina Moncrieff
- Education: Eton College

William Humble Ward, 2nd Earl of Dudley (25 May 1867 – 29 June 1932) was a British aristocrat, politician, and military officer who served as the fourth governor-general of Australia, in office from 1908 to 1911. He was previously Lord Lieutenant of Ireland from 1902 to 1905, and also a government minister under Lord Salisbury.

Dudley was the son of William Ward, 1st Earl of Dudley, and succeeded to the earldom at the age of 17. He inherited a substantial fortune and the palatial family seat at Witley Court. Dudley sat with the Conservative Party in the House of Lords, and was Parliamentary Secretary to the Board of Trade from 1895 to 1902. He was appointed Lord Lieutenant of Ireland when Arthur Balfour came to power, and was regarded as a competent administrator. His time in Dublin led to his inclusion as a character in James Joyce's Ulysses.

In part due to the urging of King Edward VII, a longtime acquaintance, Dudley was appointed Governor-General of Australia in 1908. His extravagance and pomposity made him unpopular among the general public, and his attempts to interfere in political matters rankled both prime ministers he worked with (Andrew Fisher and Alfred Deakin). Deakin regarded him as doing "nothing really important, nothing thoroughly, nothing consistently [...] very ineffective and not very popular". He was recalled to England after less than three years in office.

Dudley took command of the Queen's Own Worcestershire Hussars in 1913. He had first joined the army as a young man, and during the Second Boer War served with the Imperial Yeomanry. In World War I, Dudley commanded the Hussars for the initial stages of the Gallipoli campaign, but he returned to England before its conclusion. He was later attached to the headquarters staff of the 40th Division, and retired with the rank of lieutenant-colonel. Dudley had seven children with his first wife, and was succeeded in the earldom by his oldest son William.

== Background and education ==
Dudley was born in London, the son of William Ward, 1st Earl of Dudley, and Georgina, daughter of Sir Thomas Moncrieff, 7th Baronet. He was educated at Eton. His father died in 1885 and he inherited nearly 30,000 acres (120 km^{2}) of mineral deposits in Staffordshire and Worcestershire, two hundred coal and iron mines, several iron works (including the Round Oak Steelworks) and a substantial fortune, as well as the Earldom. He visited Australia in 1886–87 as part of a yachting cruise. Dudley became part of the social circle of the Prince of Wales (later King Edward VII), who attended his wedding to Rachel Gurney in 1891. He was appointed a deputy lieutenant for Worcestershire in 1893 and from 1895 to 1896 he was Mayor of Dudley.

== Early military service ==
Dudley joined the Queen's Own Worcestershire Hussars as a supernumerary lieutenant on 18 April 1885 and was promoted to captain on 2 June 1888 and major on 23 September 1893. After the outbreak of the Second Boer War, he was seconded for service as a Deputy Assistant Adjutant General for the Imperial Yeomanry in early 1900, and left for South Africa in the SS Scot in late January that year. He was present at operations in the Orange Free State in February to May 1900. Some of the actions he was involved with were at Poplar Grove, Driefontein, Vet River, and Zand River. From May to June 1900 he was present at operations in the Transvaal. Some of the actions he was involved with were Johannesburg, Pretoria, and Diamond Hill. He then return to the United Kingdom, and in July to November 1900 he was involved with the suppression of the Irish troubles in Belfast.

He was transferred from the Imperial Yeomanry to the Territorial Force on the latter's formation on 1 April 1908, and was seconded for service with the Colonial Office on 9 April that year, when he was posted to Australia.

== Political career ==
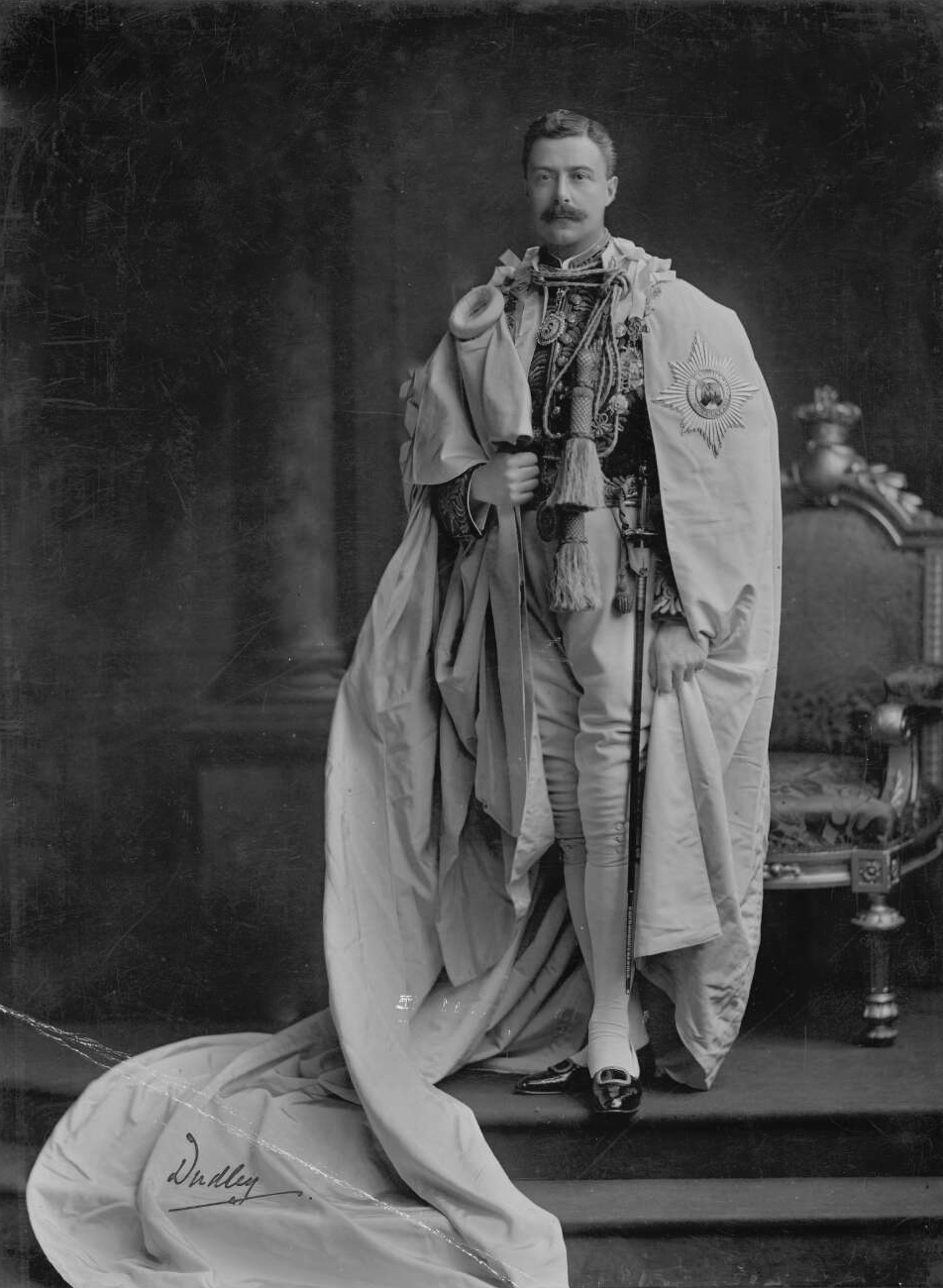
Dudley as Lord Lieutenant of Ireland and ex officio Grand Master of the Order of St Patrick

Dudley sat on the Conservative benches in the House of Lords and served under Lord Salisbury as Parliamentary Secretary to the Board of Trade from 1895 to 1902.

After Arthur Balfour succeeded as Prime Minister, Lord Dudley was on 11 August 1902 sworn a member of the Privy Council, and appointed Lord Lieutenant of Ireland. He was sworn in and formally installed as such in a ceremony at Dublin Castle on 16 August 1902, and was also appointed Grand Master of the Order of St. Patrick, as was customary for the Lord Lieutenant of Ireland. Through his years in Ireland, he displayed great extravagance but also some political and administrative ability. The Land Purchase (Ireland) Act 1903 and his cooperation with George Wyndham on a devolution scheme to deal with the Home Rule question were among important milestones. He is immortalized in Joyce's description of his Vice-Regal progress through Dublin in Ulysses. During his first visit to Belfast, in November 1902, he laid the foundation stone of the Belfast Municipal Technical Institute.

== Governor-General of Australia ==
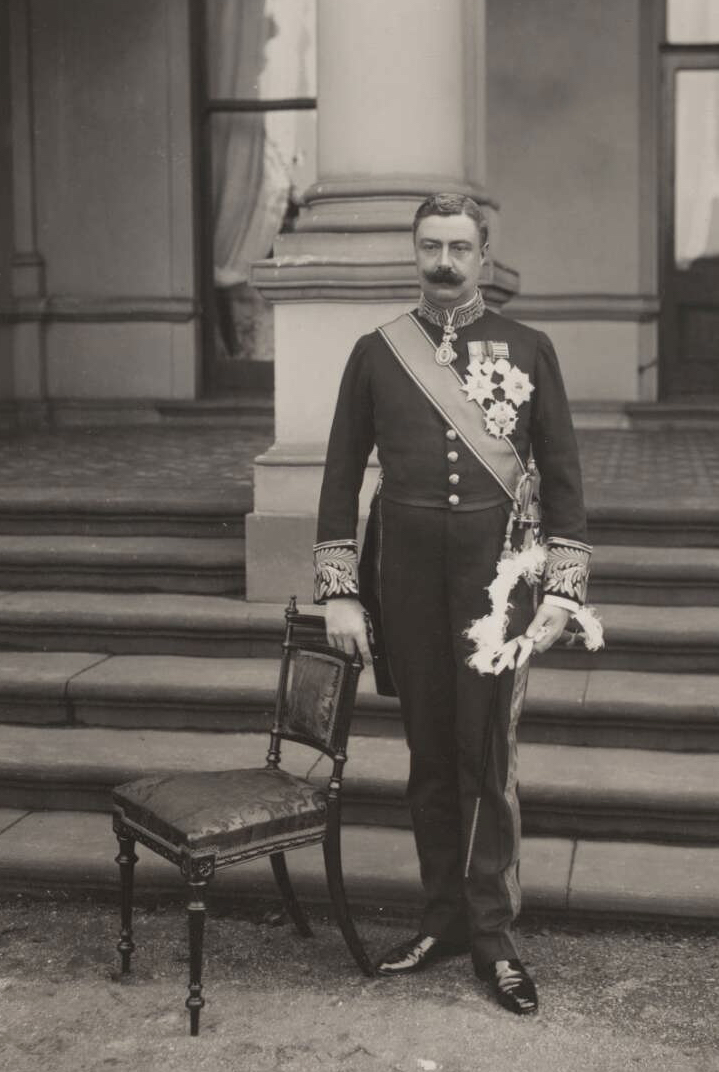
Lord Dudley in his viceregal uniform

As a Conservative, Dudley could not have expected preferment from the Liberal government which came to office in 1905, but King Edward VII pressed the prime minister, Sir Henry Campbell-Bannerman, to offer Dudley the post of Governor-General of Australia. Campbell-Bannerman agreed, since there was apparently no suitable Liberal candidate available. Dudley was appointed on 9 May 1908 and arrived in Sydney on 9 September. He soon established a reputation for pomp, ceremony and extravagance which was unwelcome to many Australians, particularly the Labor Party and the radical press such as The Bulletin. Not long after his arrival, he found himself swearing in a Labor cabinet under Andrew Fisher, so the Labor Party's disapproval of his vice-regal style became an important issue.

The new Governor-General soon found himself involved in another controversy. It was part of Labor policy to establish an independent Australian navy. The Liberal opposition, on the other hand, supported the campaign for Australia to raise money to build ships for the Royal Navy: the so-called Dreadnought campaign. So when Dudley made a speech in support of the Dreadnought campaign, he was straying into party politics, leading to a tense relationship with Fisher. In 1909 Fisher's minority government resigned, and Dudley refused him an early election. The Liberals returned to office under Alfred Deakin, solving Dudley's immediate problems. But although Fisher was careful not to criticise Dudley in public, the Governor-General had acquired a reputation as "anti-Labor," which made him unpopular with half the Australian electorate.

In April 1910 Labor won a sweeping election victory and Fisher returned to power. Relations between Governor-General and Prime Minister were soon once again frosty. Dudley's insistence on maintaining two very expensive Government Houses, in Sydney and Melbourne, on travelling around the country in vice-regal pomp, and on chartering a steam yacht to circumnavigate the continent, infuriated Fisher, a frugal Scottish socialist. By October Dudley had recognised the impossibility of his position and asked to be recalled. He left Australia on 31 July 1911, unmarked by any official ceremony. Alfred Deakin wrote of him:

His ambition was high but his interests were short-lived … He did nothing really important, nothing thoroughly, nothing consistently … He remained … a very ineffective and not very popular figurehead.

== Later military service ==
On 20 January 1912 Lord Dudley rejoined the establishment of the Worcestershire Hussars, and on 10 November 1913 he was promoted to succeed Sir Henry Foley Grey as lieutenant-colonel commanding the regiment. By this time he was convinced that there was going to be another war in Europe and formed a permanent staff of instructors to train the regiment in musketry. When war was declared in 1914, the Worcestershires formed part of the 1st South Midland Mounted Brigade, under the commander of Brigadier E. A. Wiggin. The brigade was ordered to Egypt and was based in Chatby Camp, near Alexandria, by April 1915. The brigade didn't see any action until they were ordered to prepare to fight as infantry in August. It was at this time that the men were sent to Suvla Bay, and took part in the Battle of Scimitar Hill on 21 August. The regiment were in support of the Anzacs in their attempt to break through the Turkish defenses. This attack failed miserably, and they were evacuated in January 1916. Lord Dudley had already left the regiment on 22 August 1915, when he was seconded and posted to East Mudros as Commandant, where he remained until 23 November. In 1916, Lord Dudley was attached to the headquarters staff of the 40th Infantry Division. He was transferred to the Territorial Force Reserve as a lieutenant-colonel on 23 July 1916 and relinquished his commission on 30 September 1921.

== Declining fortune ==
In 1886 Lord Dudley sold his father's important collection of porcelain at Christie's, followed in 1892 by the equally important collection of Old master paintings.

The Ward family's London home, Dudley House was sold in 1895 and following the First World War, Lord Dudley sold his magnificent country seat Witley Court in 1920.

== Yachting ==
On inheriting his Earldom he embarked in 1885–1886 on a round the world cruise in the 374 ton Steam Yacht Marchesa, built by Lobnitz, this voyage including meeting the Emperor of Brazil, and had a stop at Sydney to refit.

In 1892 he bought the 5-rater Dacia - one of the first Charles E Nicholson designs, from Hercules Langrishe. He then commissioned Vigorna, also from Camper and Nicholsons which was less successful. His next yacht Inyoni was more successful.

In 1895 he became the first Commodore of the newly formed Midland Sailing Club.

During his time as Viceroy of Ireland he was a member of the Dublin Bay and Lough Erne sailing clubs, as well as the Royal Yacht Squadron.

== Marriages and children ==
Second wife: Gertie Millar, widow of Lionel Monckton

Lord Dudley married firstly in 1891 Rachel Anne Gurney (born 8 August 1868), daughter of Charles Henry Gurney (born 5 November 1833), and Alice Prinsep, and maternal granddaughter of Henry Thoby Prinsep (1793–1878) and Sara Monckton Pattle (Calcutta, 1816–Brighton, 1887). Her sister Laura Gurney was the wife of Sir Thomas Herbert Cochrane Troubridge, 4th Baronet.

They had seven children:

- Lady Gladys Honor Ward (1892 – 5 December 1961)
- William Humble Eric Ward, 3rd Earl of Dudley (20 January 1894 – 26 December 1969)
- Lady Morvyth Lillian Ward (1896 – 11 March 1959)
- Lt Col Hon Roderick John Ward (13 April 1902 – 2 October 1952)
- Lady Alexandra Patrica Ward (24 August 1904 – 7 July 1964)
- Gp Capt Hon Edward Frederick Ward (20 November 1907 – 1987)
- George Reginald Ward, 1st and last Viscount Ward of Witley (20 November 1907 – 15 June 1988)

Lady Dudley took an interest in medical welfare. In Ireland, in 1903, she set up the Lady Dudley Nurses scheme to serve isolated rural communities in counties Connemara, Mayo, Donegal, and Kerry. In Australia, in 1911, she set up a similar scheme. She was interested in gardening, and in January 1903 was elected a Fellow of the Royal Horticultural Society. On the outbreak of World War I Lady Dudley established the Australian Voluntary Hospital from doctors and nurse in London. She drowned on 26 June 1920, aged 51, while on a visit to Connemara.

Lord Dudley remarried, on 30 April 1924, actress Gertie Millar, daughter of John Millar.

Lord Dudley died of cancer in London on 29 June 1932 at age 65 and was succeeded by his eldest son, William. Gertie, Countess of Dudley, died in April 1952. The English actresses Georgina Ward and Rachel Ward were his granddaughter and great-granddaughter respectively.

== Honours and awards ==
- Grand Master of The Most Illustrious Order of Saint Patrick, invested as Grand Master on 16 August 1902, on the day he was installed as Lord Lieutenant of Ireland, and handed over the insignia when he resigned in December 1905. He was never appointed a knight of the order.
- GCB: Knight Grand Cross of the Most Honourable Order of the Bath
- GCMG: Knight Grand Cross of the Order of St Michael and St George
- GCVO: Royal Victorian Order, Knight Grand Cross
- KStJ: Most Venerable Order of the Hospital of Saint John of Jerusalem, Knight's badge
- Territorial Decoration, with a riband bar
- Queen Victoria Diamond Jubilee Medal for Mayors
- King Edward VII Coronation Medal Medal
- King George V Coronation Medal Medal
- Queen's South Africa Medal, 5 clasps (Cape Colony, Johannesburg, Driefontein, Diamond Hill, Belfast)

== Arms ==
Coat of arms of William Humble Ward, 2nd Earl of Dudley
| Crest Out of a ducal coronet or, a lion's head azure. Escutcheon Chequy, or and azure, a bend ermine. Supporters Two angels proper, hair and wings or, under robe sanguine, upper robe azure. Motto Comme je fus (As I was) Other versions Full achievements: |

Political offices
| Preceded by Thomas Burt | Parliamentary Secretary to the Board of Trade; 1895–1902 | Succeeded by Bonar Law |
| Preceded by The Earl Cadogan | Lord Lieutenant of Ireland; 1902–1905 | Succeeded by The Earl of Aberdeen |
Government offices
| Preceded by The Lord Northcote | Governor-General of Australia; 1908–1911 | Succeeded by The Lord Denman |
Peerage of the United Kingdom
| Preceded by William Ward | Earl of Dudley; 1885–1932 | Succeeded by William Humble Eric Ward |
