= Georgina Ward, Countess of Dudley =

British noblewoman (1846–1929)

The Right Honourable The Countess of Dudley RRC DStJ
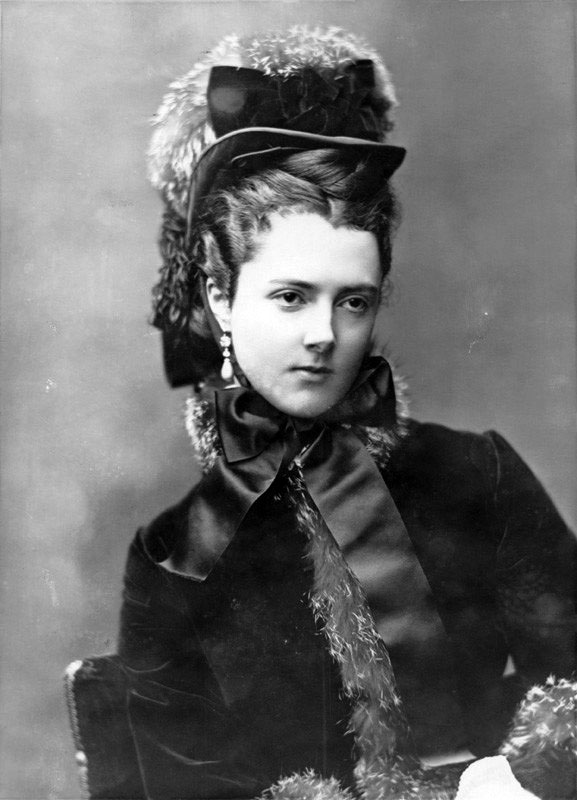
- The Countess of Dudley in the 1880s

Personal details
- Born: Georgina Elizabeth Moncreiffe; 9 August 1846 Dunbarney, Perthshire, Scotland
- Died: 2 February 1929 (aged 82) Pembroke Lodge, London, England
- Spouse: William Ward, 1st Earl of Dudley (m. 1865; died 1885)
- Children: 7, including William Ward, 2nd Earl of Dudley; Sir John Hubert Ward
- Awards: Royal Red Cross; Dame of the Order of Saint John

Georgina Elizabeth Ward, Countess of Dudley RRC, DStJ (née Moncreiffe; 9 August 1846 – 2 February 1929) was a British noblewoman and noted beauty of the Victorian era.

== Early life and family ==
Georgina was born in Dunbarney, Perthshire, Scotland – "the third of a series of [eight] sisters all famous for their good looks" – to Sir Thomas Moncreiffe, 7th Baronet, and Lady Louisa Hay-Drummond, daughter of Thomas Hay-Drummond, 11th Earl of Kinnoull. Her sister Harriet became Lady Mordaunt; another sister, Louisa, married John Stewart-Murray, 7th Duke of Atholl.

== Marriage ==
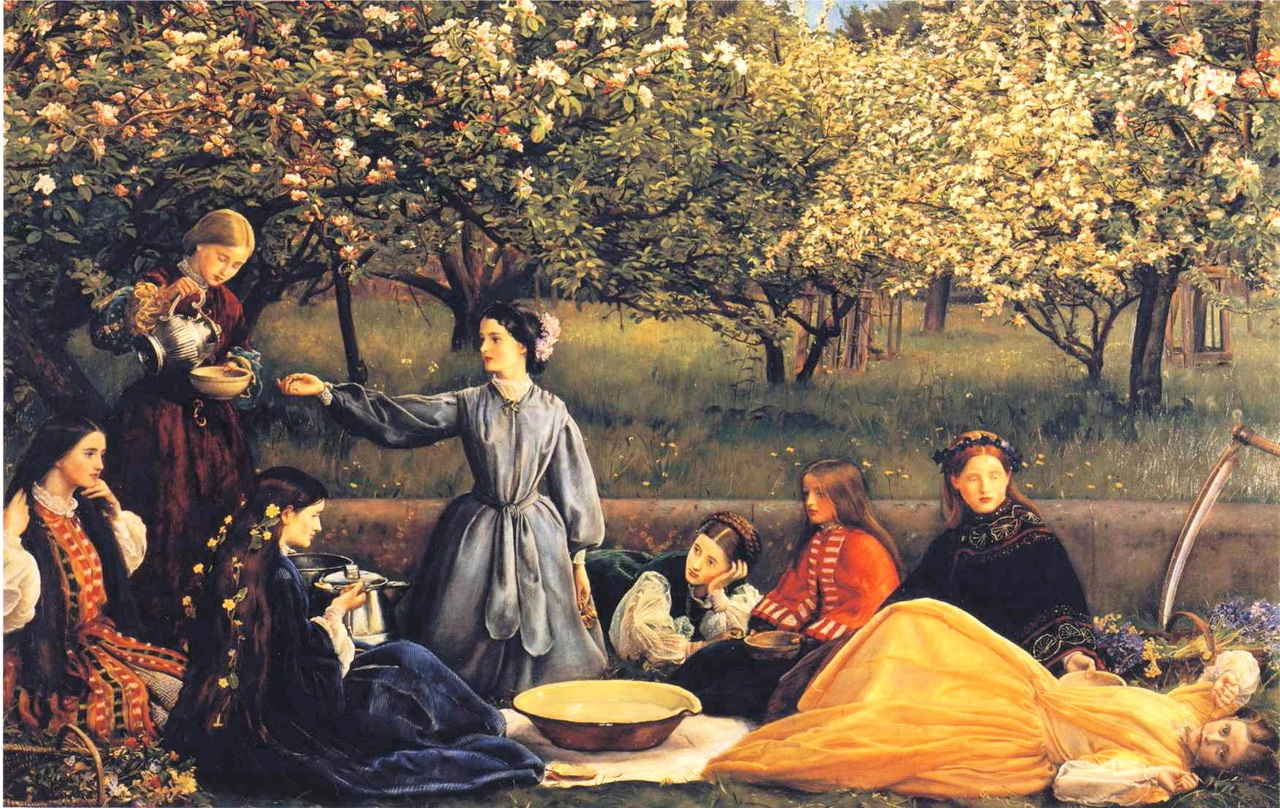
Spring by John Everett Millais (1856–59), with Georgina Moncrieffe the central figure, kneeling in a blue dress. Millais painted most of the figures in 1858.

In the summer of 1865, the engagement was announced between the 18-year-old Georgina and the 48-year-old William Ward, 1st Earl of Dudley, a wealthy land and mine owner. The Earl had been widowed since November 1851 as his first wife, Selina Constance (née de Burgh), died six months into their marriage. Georgina and the Earl married on 21 November 1865 in London, and Dudley was proud to show off his beautiful new wife across Europe:

Her loveliness was something quite apart. Scores of women may be said to have challenged her supremacy, and to have been her superiors at certain points, but her exquisitely shaped and poised head, her flowerlike complexion, her matchlessly beautiful eyes,, her dignity of carriage, even in early youth, made her fame to ring through Europe. At Compiègne the Empress Eugénie and her Court, which consisted of all that was fair in France, confessed themselves completely outshone. In Vienna the crowds gathered in the Plaza to watch the Imperial carriage pass to and fro admitted that their hitherto peerless Empress paled before the Englishwoman seated by her side.

— Obituary of Lady Dudley in The Times, 4 February 1929

Over the course of their marriage, Georgina and Dudley had one daughter and six sons. Dudley spoiled his wife with the finest clothes and jewels, but gave her no say in the running of their magnificent homes at Witley Court and Dudley House.

For 14 years this queen of beauty lived in something like a gilded cage, from which, however, there was no wish to escape. Lord Dudley, a man of cultured taste and many accomplishments, was benevolent and bountiful, but whimsically despotic. He insisted on his wife's wearing full dress, even at the remotest shooting lodge in the Highlands; he loaded her with gorgeous jewels, some of which were the subject of a remarkable robbery; he bought the famous Coventry vases for a birthday present; he gave her everything – always excepting any measure of responsibility.

— Obituary of Lady Dudley in The Times, 4 February 1929

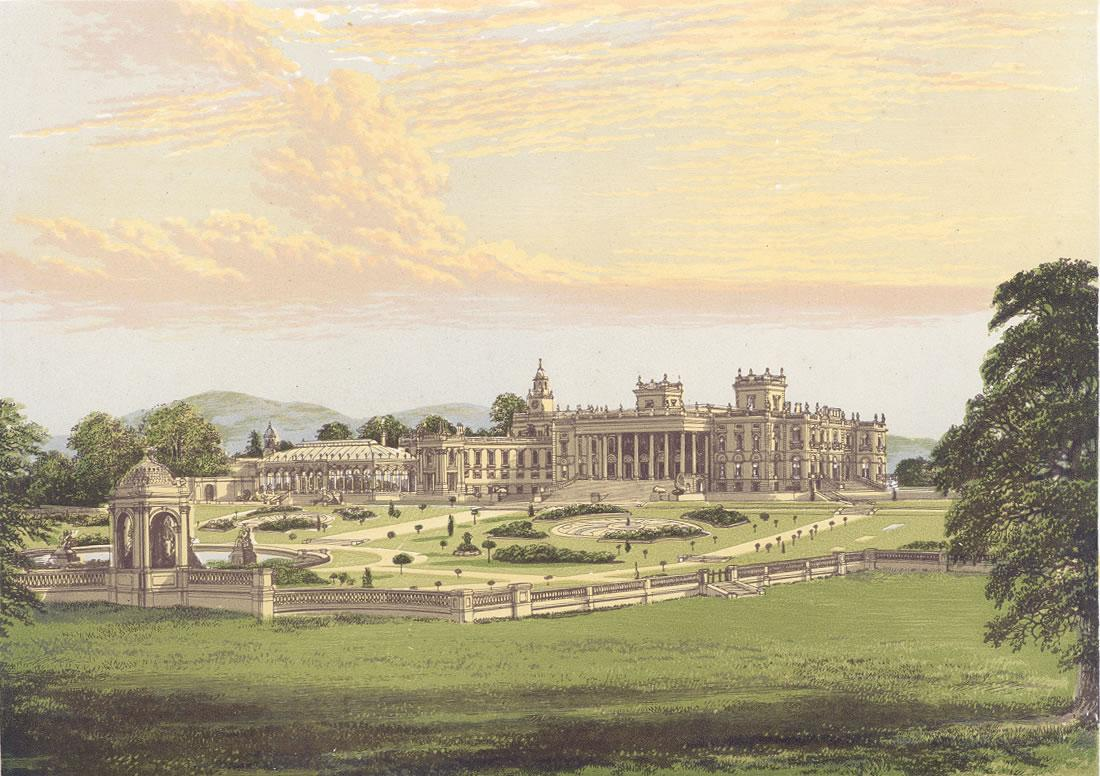
The Dudley family estate at Witley Court, 1880

The theft of Lady Dudley's jewels on 12 December 1874 at Paddington Station was a famous crime in Victorian England. The jewels, worth perhaps £25,000, were never recovered.

In 1879, the Earl suffered a stroke, on the same day they had been preparing for a large party with a poetry reading by actress Sarah Bernhardt. The Countess at once took charge of both the management of the family estates and his health. She dutifully nursed him and stayed by his side, with the exception of when business required her elsewhere. She was only rarely seen at social engagements without him.

He died of pneumonia on 7 May 1885.

== Later life ==
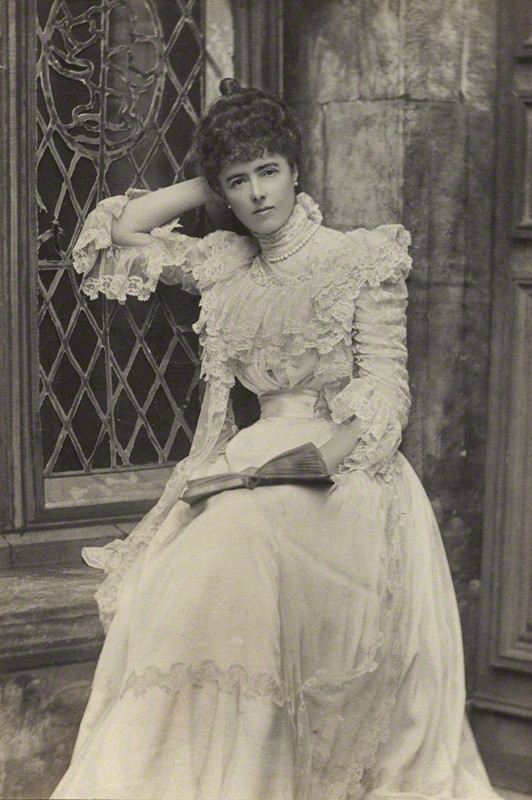
The Dowager Countess, circa 1902, in a photo by Alice Hughes

After the Earl's death, Lady Dudley resumed a more active social calendar. She never remarried despite many offers for her hand in marriage, with a son of Otto von Bismarck among her reported suitors. She remained wholly dedicated to her family and sons' education, as well as to national service and charitable organisations.

In 1908, she was appointed a Lady President of the League of Mercy, an organisation established to recruit volunteers to aid the sick and suffering at charity hospitals.

During the Boer War and World War I, she served with the British Red Cross Society. In late 1900, she was involved in running the Mayfair nursing home for disabled officers under its auspices. Her actions at that time proved to be pivotal in ensuring Captain Trenchard (later to become Marshal of the Royal Air Force) recovered from a wound he had received in action. From 1914 to 1918, she worked nine hours per day at the convalescent hospital, taking care of the needs of the injured. She lost her youngest son in the early days of the war.

She was a close friend of Queen Alexandra. As dowager countess, Lady Dudley lived at Pembroke Lodge in London, granted to her by "grace and favour" of King Edward VII.

She died at Pembroke Lodge in February 1929 at the age of 82, having spent more than half of her life as a widow.

== Children ==
The Earl and Countess had six sons and one daughter. Their fourth son, Capt. Reginald Ward, died in 1904 after an appendectomy in London. Their youngest son, Lieutenant Gerald Ward, a first class-cricketer for Marylebone Cricket Club, was killed in action in 1914 while serving with the 1st Life Guards at Zandvoorde, Belgium. Their great-granddaughter was the actress Georgina Ward.

- William Humble Ward, 2nd Earl of Dudley (25 May 1867 – 29 June 1932)
- Hon. Sir John Hubert Ward (20 March 1870 – 2 December 1938)
- Hon. Robert Arthur Ward (23 February 1871 – 14 June 1942)
- Lady Edith Amelia Ward, later Lady Wolverton (16 September 1872 – 6 June 1956), married Frederick Glyn, 4th Baron Wolverton
- Captain Hon. Reginald Ward (11 June 1874 – 7 March 1904)
- Captain Hon. Cyril Augustus Ward (31 January 1876 – 11 January 1930)
- Lieutenant Hon. Gerald Ernest Francis Ward (9 November 1877 – 30 October 1914)

== Honours ==
The Countess was made a Dame of Grace of the Order of Saint John in 1901, and promoted to Dame of Justice of that order in 1928. She was awarded the Royal Red Cross in 1902.

== Mention in A Room of One's Own ==
In A Room of One's Own, by Virginia Woolf, the Countess is written about thus: "That profoundly interesting subject, the value that men set upon women's chastity and its effect upon their education, here suggests itself for discussion, and might provide an interesting book if any student at Girton or Newnham cared to go into the matter. Lady Dudley, sitting in diamonds among the midges of a Scottish moor, might serve for frontispiece. Lord Dudley, THE TIMES said when Lady Dudley died the other day, 'a man of cultivated taste and many accomplishments, was benevolent and bountiful, but whimsically despotic. He insisted upon his wife's wearing full dress, even at the remotest shooting-lodge in the Highlands; he loaded her with gorgeous jewels', and so on, 'he gave her everything--always excepting any measure of responsibility'. Then Lord Dudley had a stroke and she nursed him and ruled his estates with supreme competence for ever after. That whimsical despotism was in the nineteenth century too."
