= William Ward, 1st Earl of Dudley =

English landowner and philanthropist (1817–1885)

The Right Honourable The Earl of Dudley
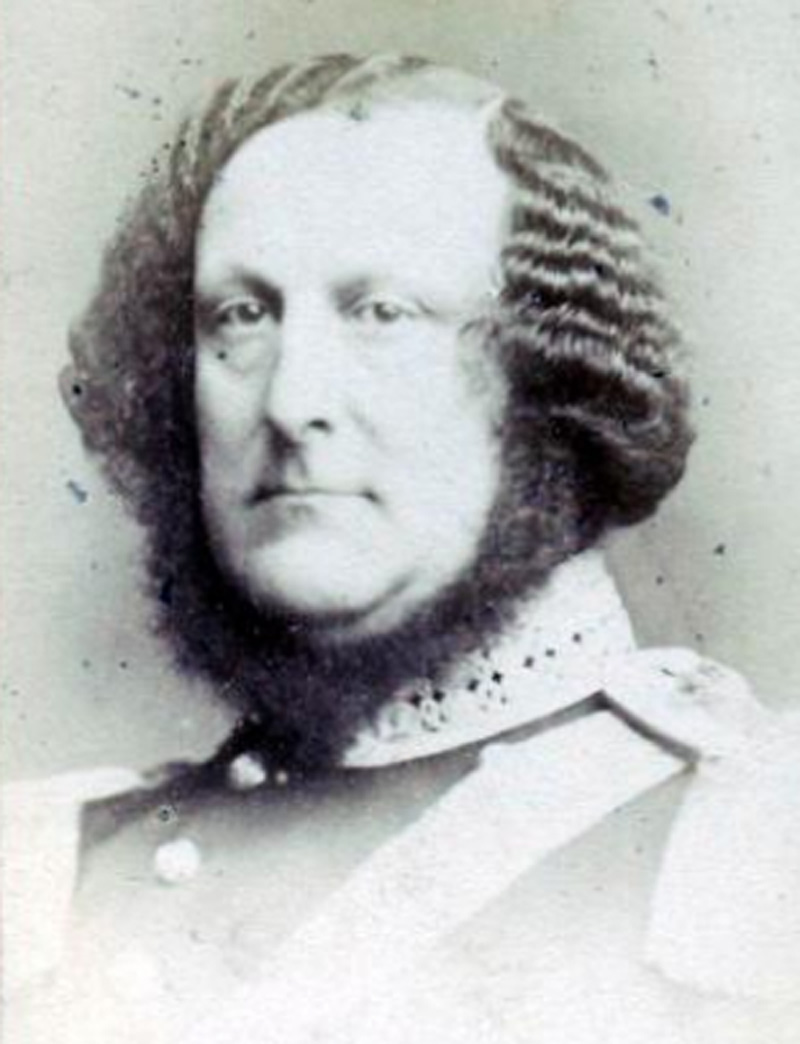
- The Earl of Dudley circa 1860

Member of the House of Lords
- Lord Temporal
- Hereditary Peer; 6 December 1835 – 7 May 1885
- Preceded by: William Humble Ward, 10th Baron Ward
- Succeeded by: William Ward, 2nd Earl of Dudley

Personal details
- Born: William Ward; 27 March 1817 Edwardstone, Boxford, Suffolk
- Died: 7 May 1885 (aged 68)
- Spouses: Selina Constance de Burgh (m. 1851; died 1851) Georgina Elisabeth Moncreiffe (m. 1865)
- Children: 7, including William Ward, 2nd Earl of Dudley; John Hubert Ward
- Parent(s): William Ward, 10th Baron Ward; Amelia Pillans
- Education: Eton College
- Alma mater: Christ Church, Oxford; Trinity College, Oxford

William Ward, 1st Earl of Dudley (27 March 1817 – 7 May 1885), known as the Lord Ward from 1835 to 1860, was an English landowner and philanthropist.

== Background and education ==
Ward was born on 27 March 1817 at Edwardstone, Boxford, Suffolk, England, the son of William Ward, 10th Baron Ward. His mother was Amelia, daughter of William Cooch Pillans.

He was educated at Eton and at Christ Church, Oxford and Trinity College, Oxford, where he studied under David Melille. He played first-class cricket for Oxford University Cricket Club between 1838 and 1842.

== Career ==
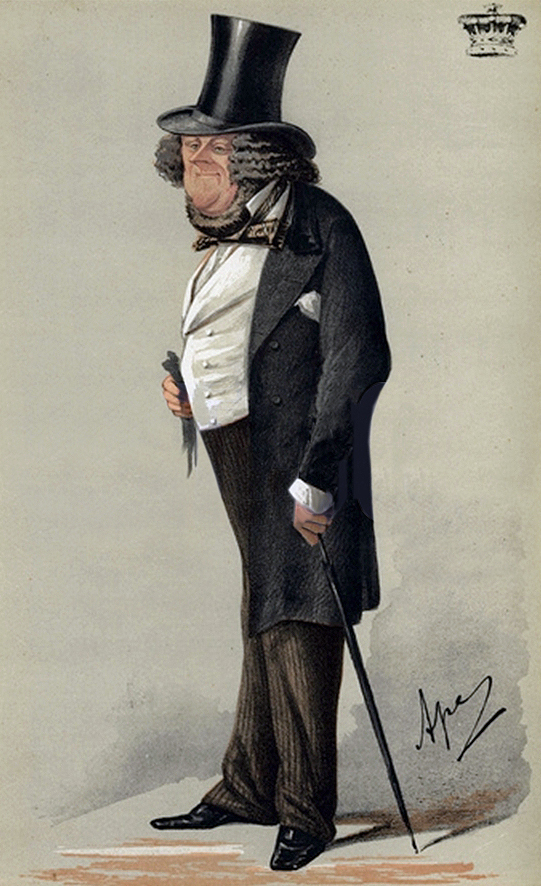
The Earl of Dudley as caricatured by Ape (Carlo Pellegrini) in Vanity Fair, June 1870

On 6 December 1835, he inherited the title of Lord Ward, when he became the 11th Baron Ward. His inheritance included Himley Hall and the ruins of Dudley Castle. In 1837 his trustees purchased the Witley Court estate in Worcestershire from Thomas Foley, 4th Baron Foley.

Ward never held any political office, but served as Colonel Commander of the Worcestershire Yeomanry in 1854.

Between 1859 and 1877 Ward paid for the entire refacing and restoration of Worcester Cathedral and there is a monument to him in the cathedral. In 1868 he defrayed one third of the cost of the tower and spire of St John the Baptist's Church at Hagley. He was also a trustee of the National Gallery and the National Portrait Gallery.

In 1860, the earldom held by his kinsman was revived when he was created Viscount Ednam, of Ednam in the County of Roxburgh, and Earl of Dudley, of Dudley Castle in the County of Stafford.

== Personal life ==
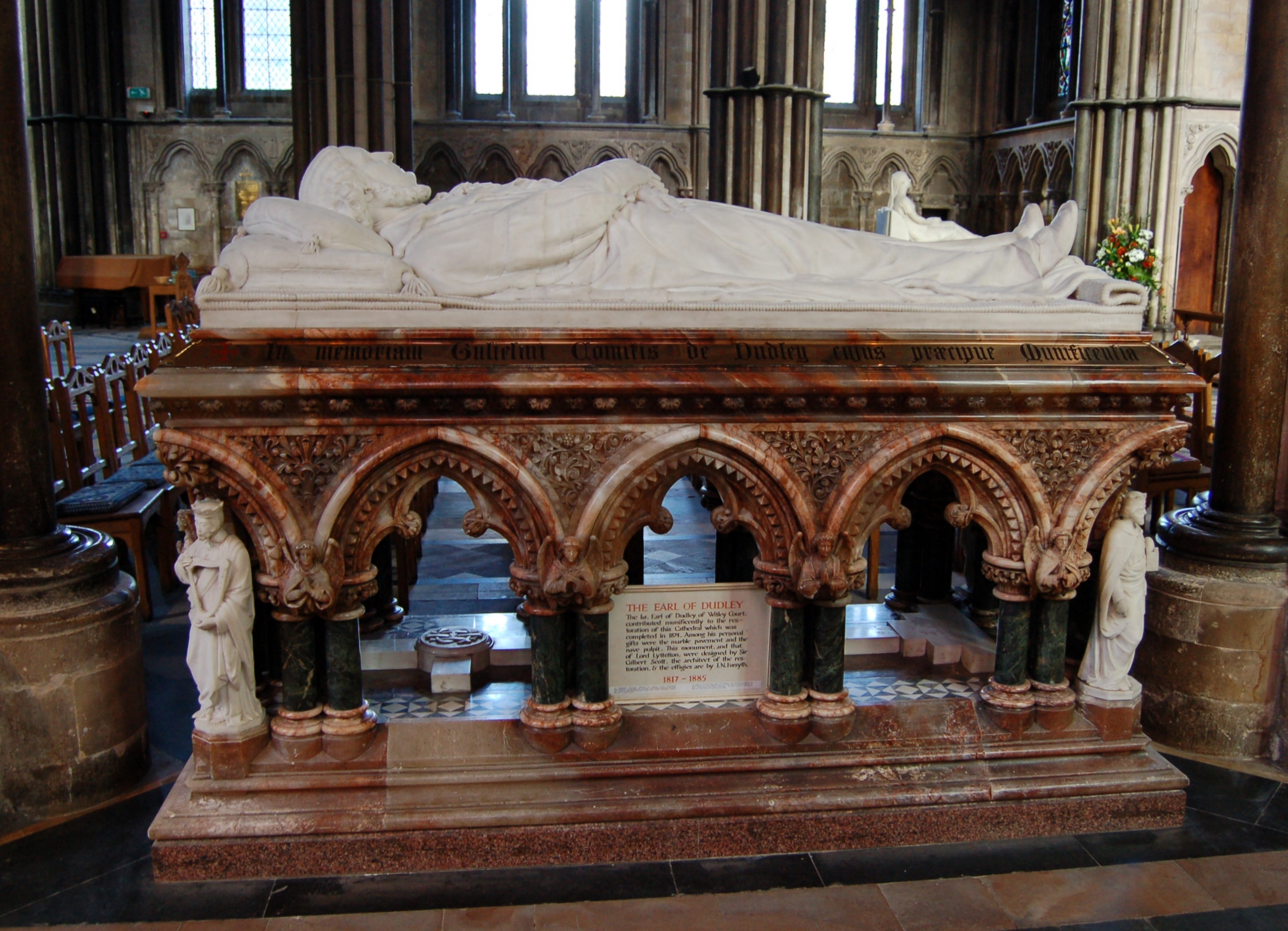
The funerary monument to William Ward, 1st Earl of Dudley, in Worcester Cathedral

Lord Dudley married, firstly, Selina Constance, daughter of Hubert de Burgh, on 24 April 1851. She died on 14 November of the same year, aged only 22. There were no children from this marriage.

He married, secondly, Georgina Elisabeth, daughter of Sir Thomas Moncreiffe, 7th Baronet, and Lady Louisa Hay-Drummond, on 21 November 1865. His sister-in-law Harriet Moncreiffe, who a few years later, as Lady Mordaunt, became embroiled in a sensational divorce case, referred to him as "frizzle wig". Together, William and Georgina were the parents of six sons and one daughter:

- William Humble Ward, 2nd Earl of Dudley (1867–1932), who succeeded his father and became a prominent Conservative politician who married Rachel Gurney CBE, the youngest daughter of Charles Henry Gurney.
- Hon. Sir John Hubert Ward (1870–1938), who married Jean Templeton Reid, daughter of U.S. Ambassador Whitelaw Reid.
- Hon. Robert Arthur Ward (1871–1942), who married Lady Mary Acheson, a daughter of Archibald Acheson, 4th Earl of Gosford and Lady Louisa Montagu (daughter of William Montagu, 7th Duke of Manchester).
- Lady Edith Amelia Ward (1872–1956), who married Frederick Glyn, 4th Baron Wolverton.
- Captain Hon. Reginald Ward, DSO (1874–1904), of the Royal Horse Guards.
- Captain Hon. Cyril Augustus Ward (1876–1930), who married Baroness Irene de Brienen, a daughter of Baron de Brienen. He took part in the Parker expedition to Jerusalem, going to Jerusalem in 1909. He served with the Royal Navy during the First World War. He was declared bankrupt in 1923 and subsequently moved to Kenya where he died.
- Hon. Gerald Ernest Francis Ward MVO (1877–1914), a first-class cricketer for Marylebone Cricket Club (MCC), who served in the 1st Life Guards during the First World War and was killed in action at Zandvoorde, Belgium. He married Lady Evelyn Crichton, a daughter of John Crichton, 4th Earl Erne and Lady Florence Cole (daughter of William Cole, 3rd Earl of Enniskillen).

He owned 25,000 acres, with most of his income coming from 5,000 acres in Staffordshire.

Ward died on 7 May 1885, aged 68, at Dudley House, Park Lane, Mayfair, in London, and was originally buried in a marble sarcophagus in the crypt of Saint Michael and All Angels Church in Great Witley, Worcestershire. His remains were later moved to Worcester Cathedral, where a funerary monument to him was erected. The Countess of Dudley survived her husband by over forty years and died in February 1929 at her home at Pembroke Lodge, Richmond Park at the age of 82, having spent over half her life as a widow.

Peerage of the United Kingdom
New creation	Earl of Dudley; 1860–1885	Succeeded by William Humble Ward
Peerage of England
Preceded by William Humble Ward	Baron Ward; 1835–1885	Succeeded by William Humble Ward
