= Sir Thomas Moncreiffe, 7th Baronet =

Scottish first-class cricketer and British Army officer

Personal information
- Full name: Thomas Moncreiffe
- Born: 9 January 1822; Moncreiffe House, Perthshire, Scotland
- Died: 16 August 1879 (aged 57); Moncreiffe House, Perthshire, Scotland
- Batting: Unknown
- Relatives: Georgina Ward, Countess of Dudley (daughter); Gerald Ward (grandson); Lord Ward (son-in-law)

Domestic team information
- Years: Team
- 1841–1852: Marylebone Cricket Club

Career statistics
Competition	First-class
Matches	7
Runs scored	43
Batting average	4.77
100s/50s	–/–
Top score	9
Catches/stumpings	3/–
- Source: Cricinfo, 21 November 2019

Sir Thomas Moncreiffe, 7th Baronet (9 January 1822 – 16 August 1879) was a Scottish first-class cricketer and British Army officer.

The son of Sir David Moncreiffe and his wife, Helen Mackay, he was born at Moncreiffe House in Perthshire in January 1822. His father died in November 1830, with Moncreiffe succeeding him as the 7th Baronet of the Moncreiffe baronets. He was educated at Harrow School, after which he joined the Scots Guards. He made his debut in first-class cricket for the Marylebone Cricket Club (MCC) against Cambridge University at Lord's in 1841. He later transferred to the Grenadier Guards and by January 1846, he had been promoted to the rank of lieutenant colonel, while serving in the Royal Perthshire Militia. In 1848, he appeared twice for the MCC in two first-class matches played against Oxford University and the Surrey Club. Four years later, he made three final appearances in first-class cricket, playing twice for the MCC and once for the Gentlemen of the North against the Gentlemen of the South. He was appointed as the honorary colonel of the Royal Perthshire Rifle Militia in October 1855.

He was appointed to be the Vice Lord Lieutenant of Perthshire in May 1878. Moncreiffe was a member of the Royal Company of Archers, having been admitted in 1837, and a captain of The Royal and Ancient Golf Club of St Andrews. He died at Moncreiffe House in August 1879. He was succeeded in the baronetcy by his son, Robert Moncreiffe, one of sixteen children he had with his wife, Lady Louisa Hay-Drummond, whom he had married in 1843. His grandson, Gerald Ward, later also played first-class cricket.

A former president of the Perthshire Society of Natural Science, the building's museum, formerly at 62–72 Tay Street in Perth, was built in his memory.

Baronetage of Nova Scotia
Preceded by David Moncreiffe	Baronet (of Moncreiffe); 1830–1879	Succeeded by Robert Moncreiffe
