= Royal Academy Exhibition of 1859 =

1859 art exhibition in London

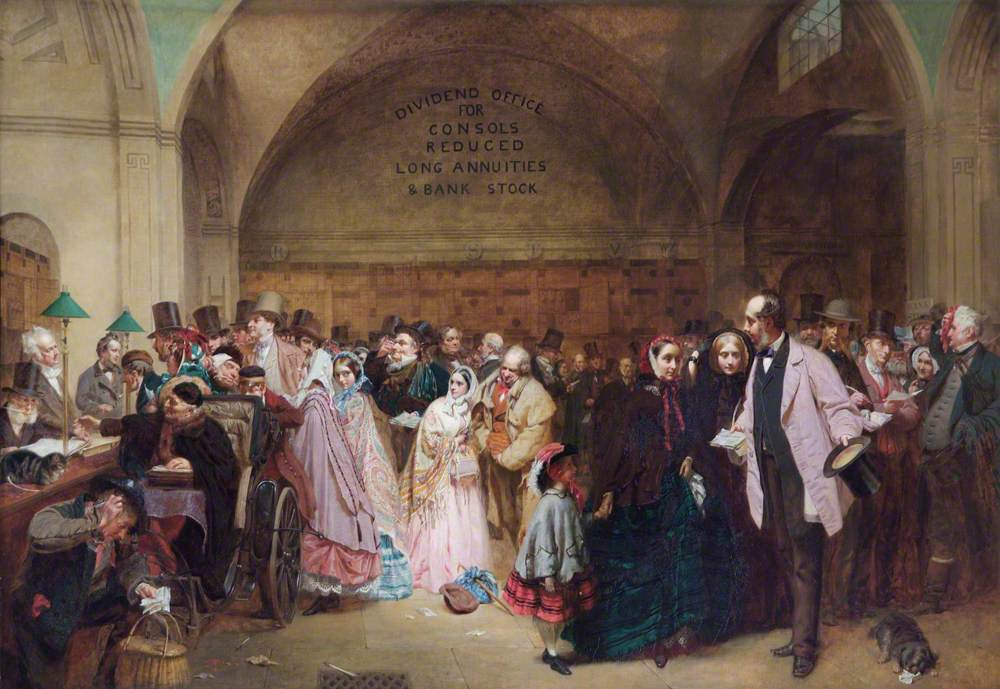
Dividend Day at the Bank of England by George Elgar Hicks

The Royal Academy Exhibition of 1859 was the ninety first annual Summer Exhibition of the British Royal Academy of Arts. It was held at the National Gallery on Trafalgar Square in London between 2 May and 23 July 1859. It was notable for two sequel paintings Henry Nelson O'Neil's Home Again and Abraham Solomon's Not Guilty. John Everett Millais's The Vale of Rest and Spring provoked a debate about the continuing legacy of the Pre-Raphaelite movement. Millais also submitted the historical painting The Love of James the First of Scotland. One of the most popular works with the public was Dividend Day at the Bank of England by George Elgar Hicks.

Having recently had a painting rejected by the British Institution, Frederic Leighton carefully selected three works to exhibit, all featuring the Italian model Anna Risi. Daniel Maclise submitted a single painting The Poet to His Wife based on a song by Thomas Moore. Edwin Landseer's Doubtful Crumbs continued his theme of sentimental animal painting. William Powell Frith displayed the portrait Charles Dickens in His Study while other members of The Clique were also prominently displayed, with John Phillip presenting a portrait of his friend and fellow artist Augustus Egg. Francis Grant continued in the tradition of Thomas Lawrence by displaying high society portraits while Clarkson Stanfield featured romantic seascapes such as On the Coast of Brittany. Emily Osborn was amongst the female artists who displayed works.

== Gallery ==
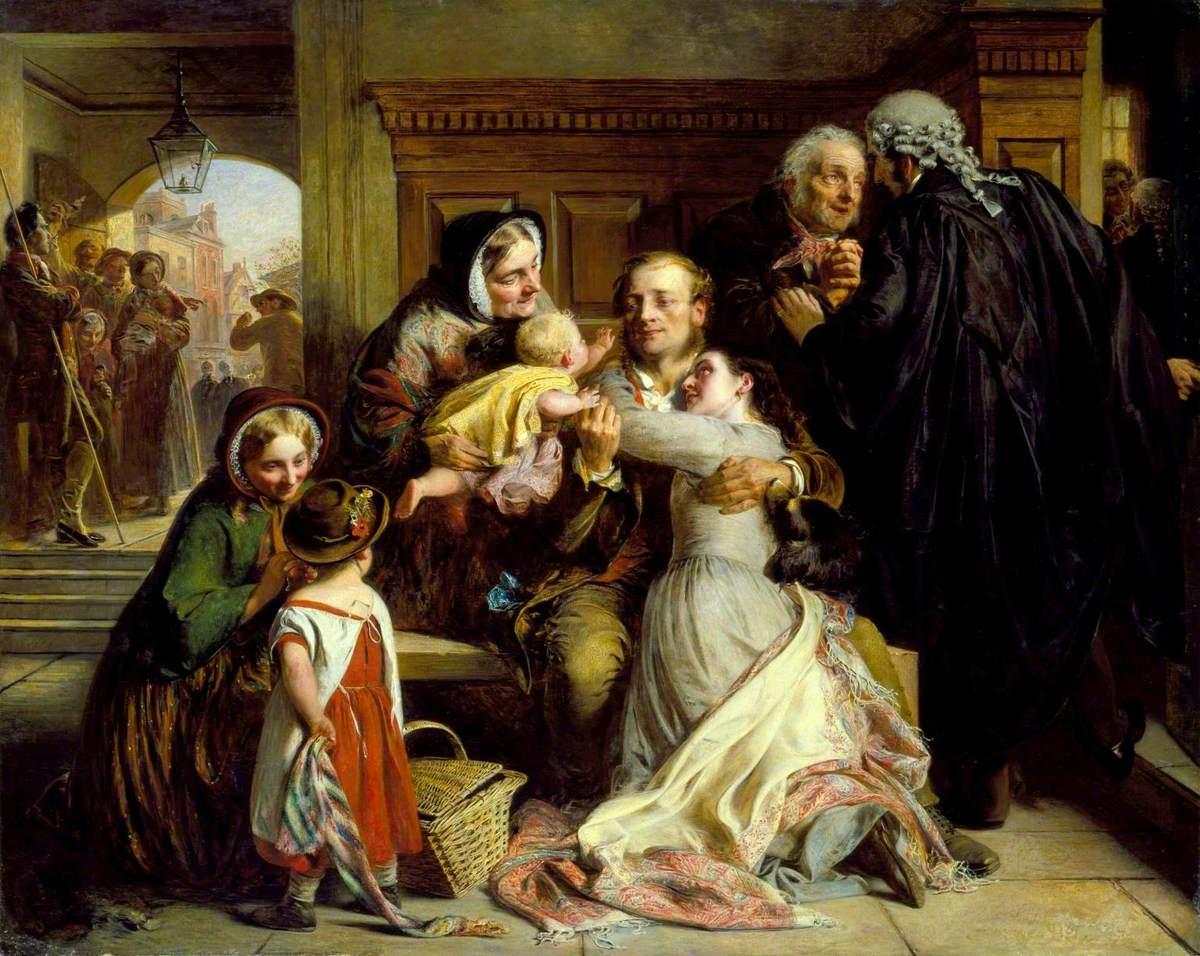
Not Guilty by Abraham Solomon

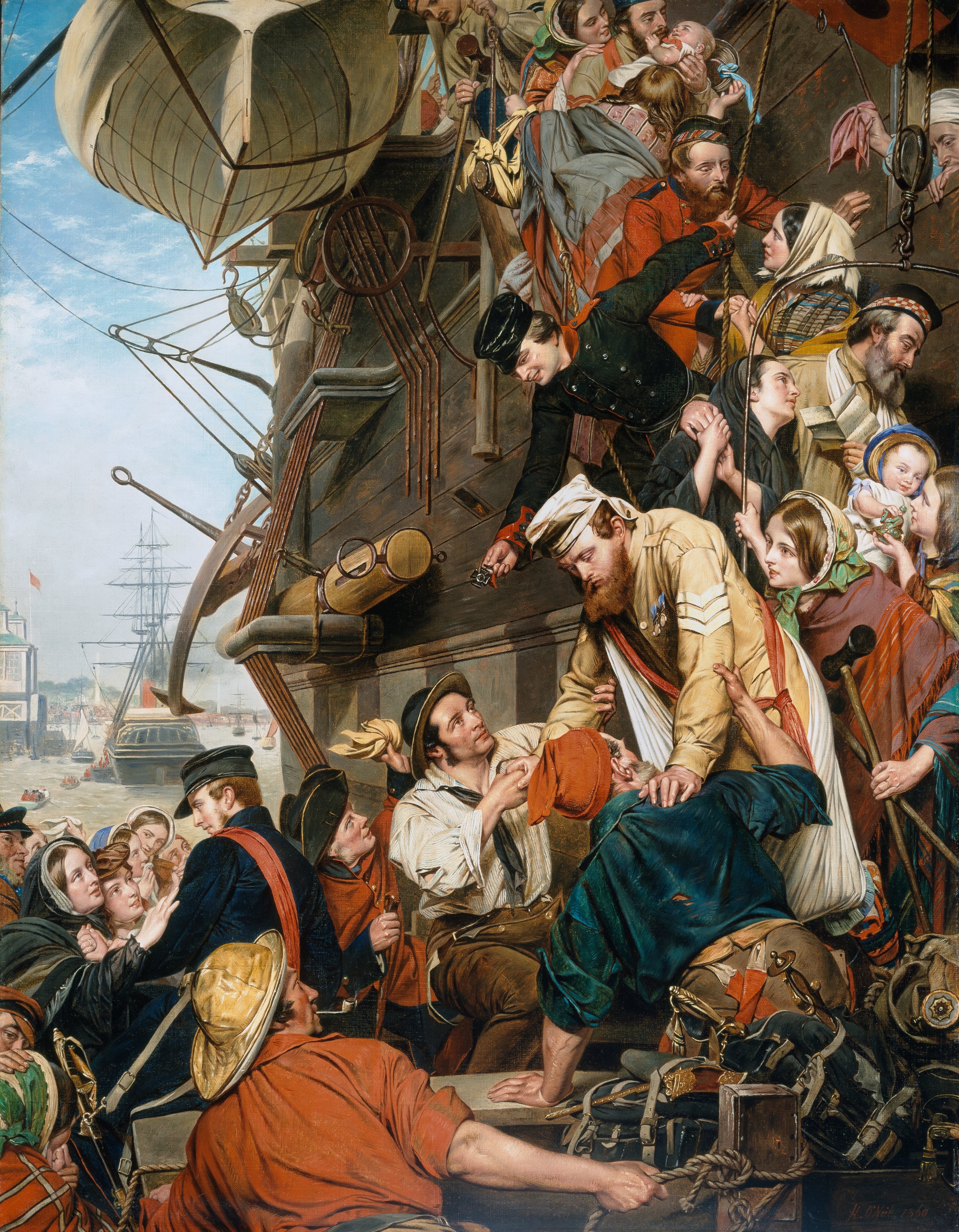
Home Again by Henry Nelson O'Neil

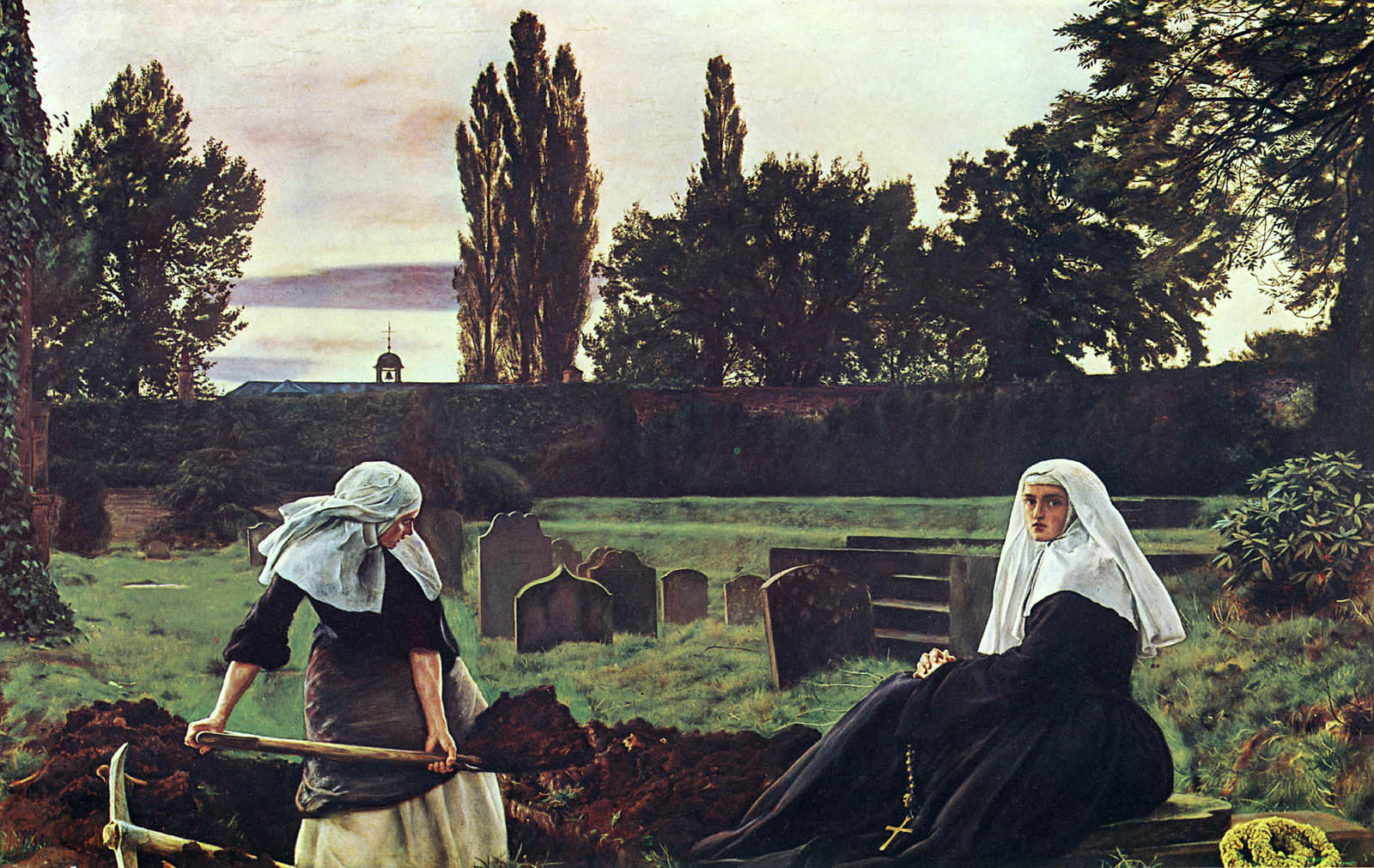
The Vale of Rest by John Everett Millais

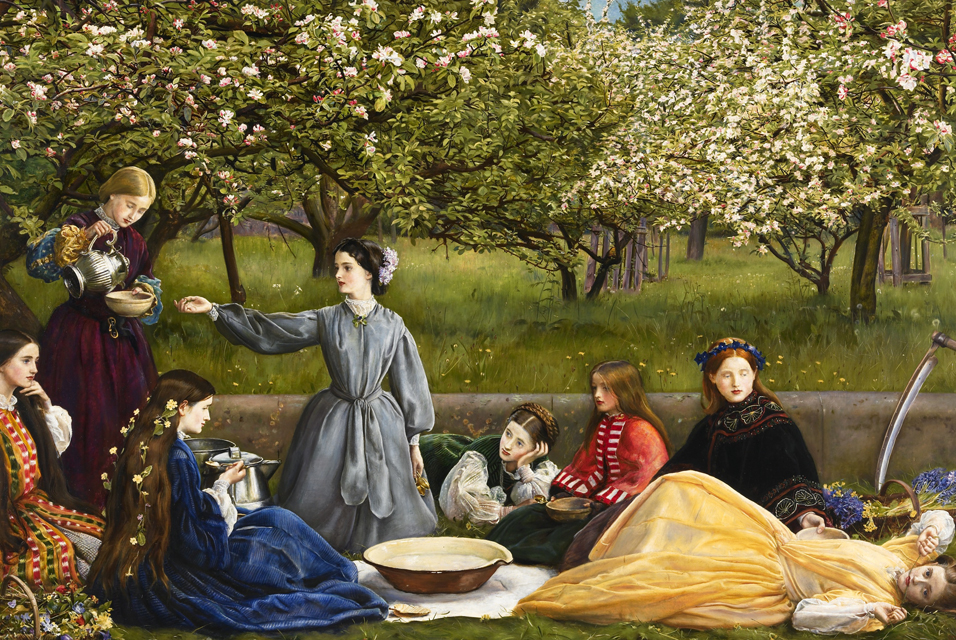
Spring by John Everett Millais

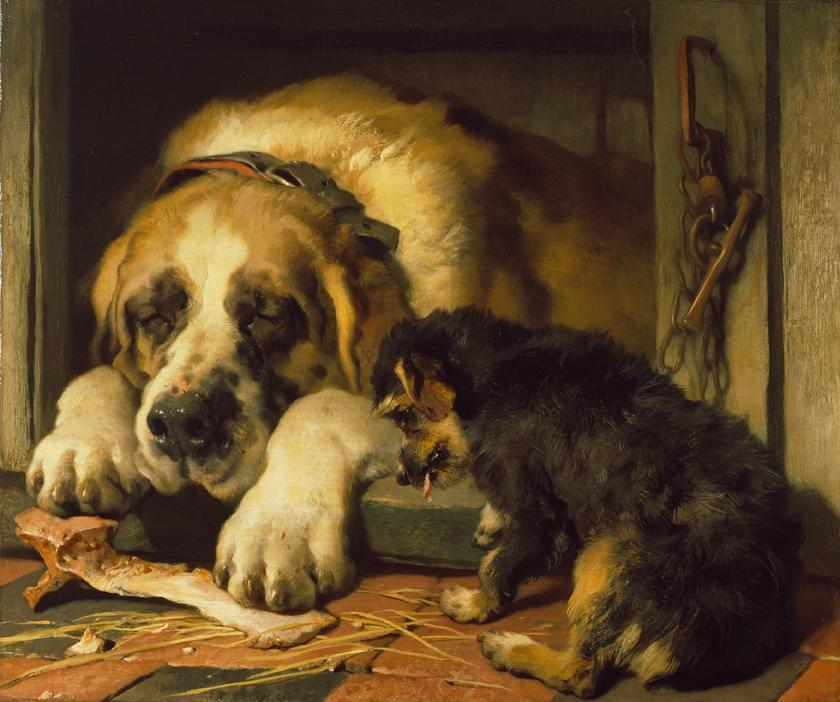
Doubtful Crumbs by Edwin Landseer

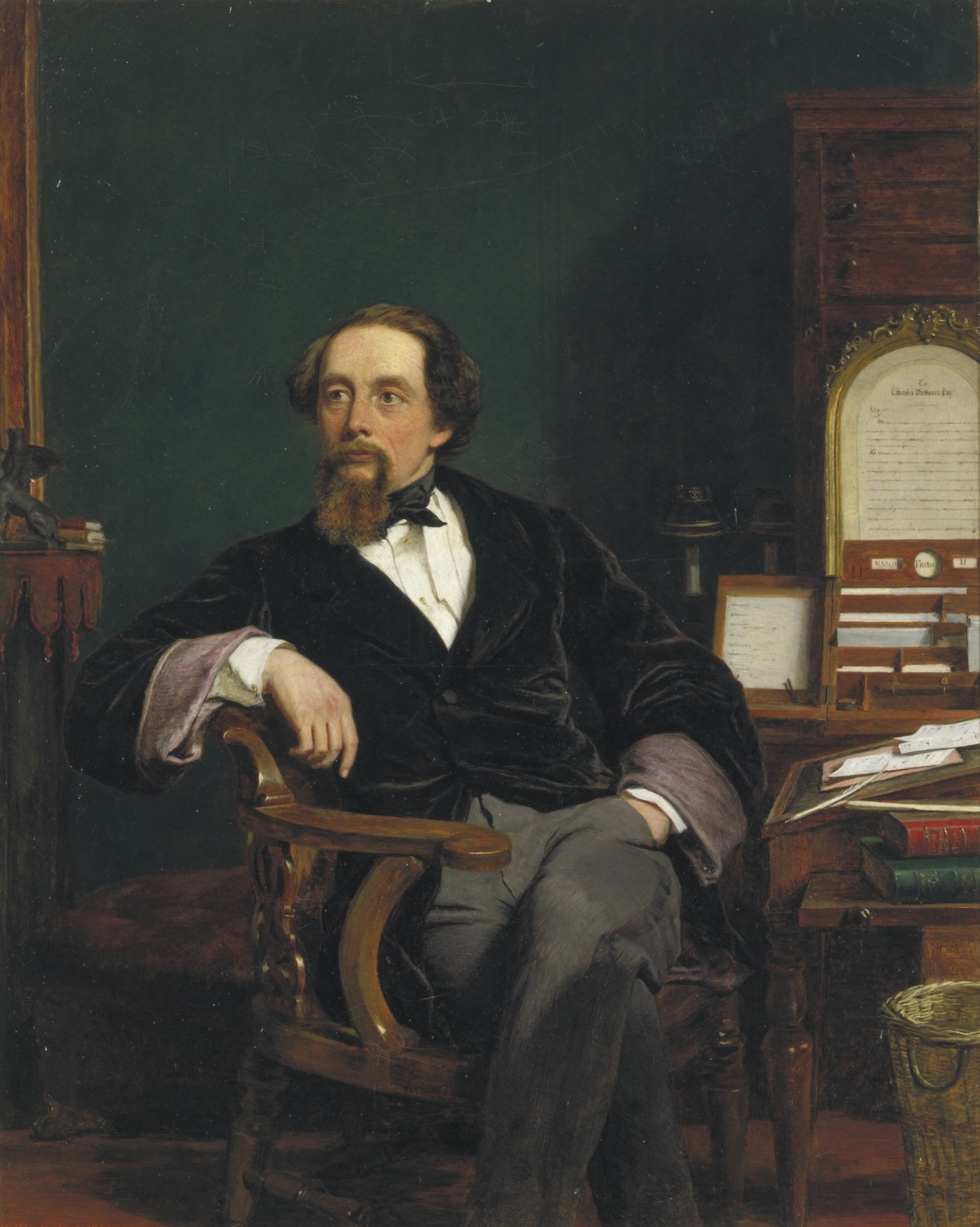
Charles Dickens in His Study by William Powell Frith

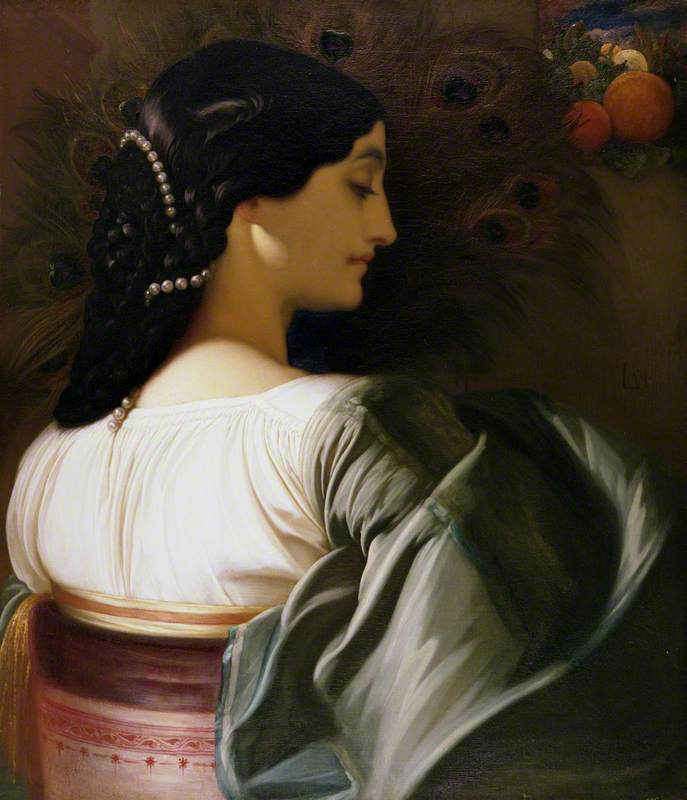
Pavonia by Frederic Leighton

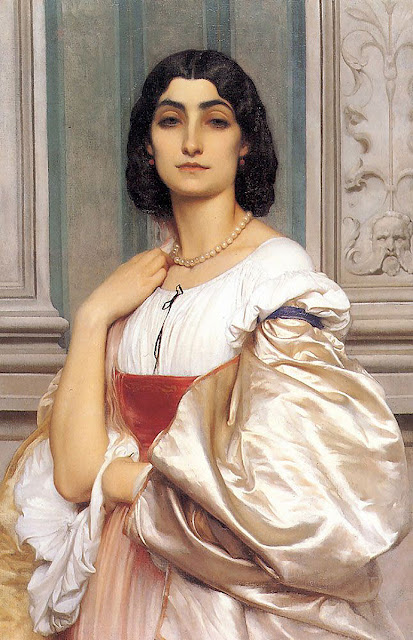
A Roman Lady by Frederic Leighton

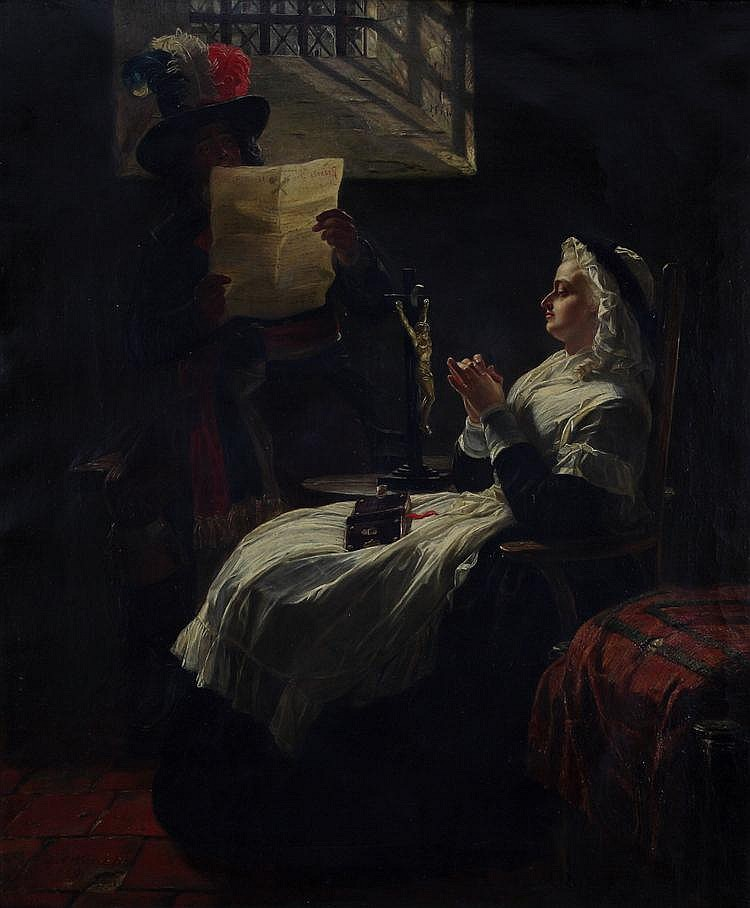
Marie Antoinette Listening to the Act of Accusation the Day Before Her Trial by Edward Matthew Ward

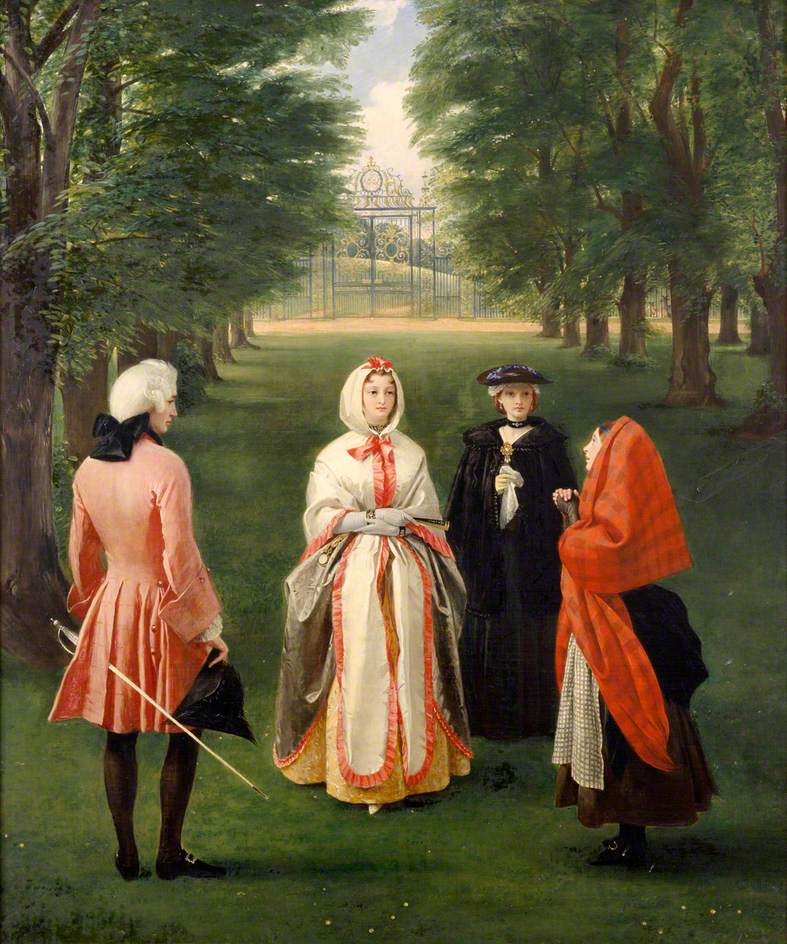
Jeanie Deans and Queen Caroline by Charles Robert Leslie

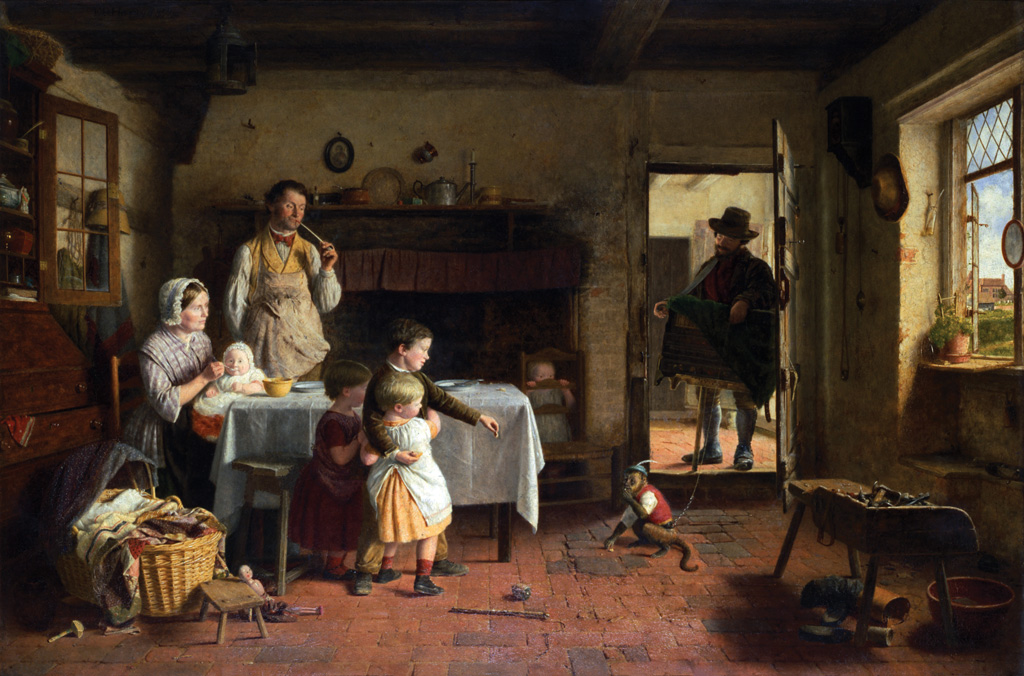
The Foreign Guest by Frederick Daniel Hardy

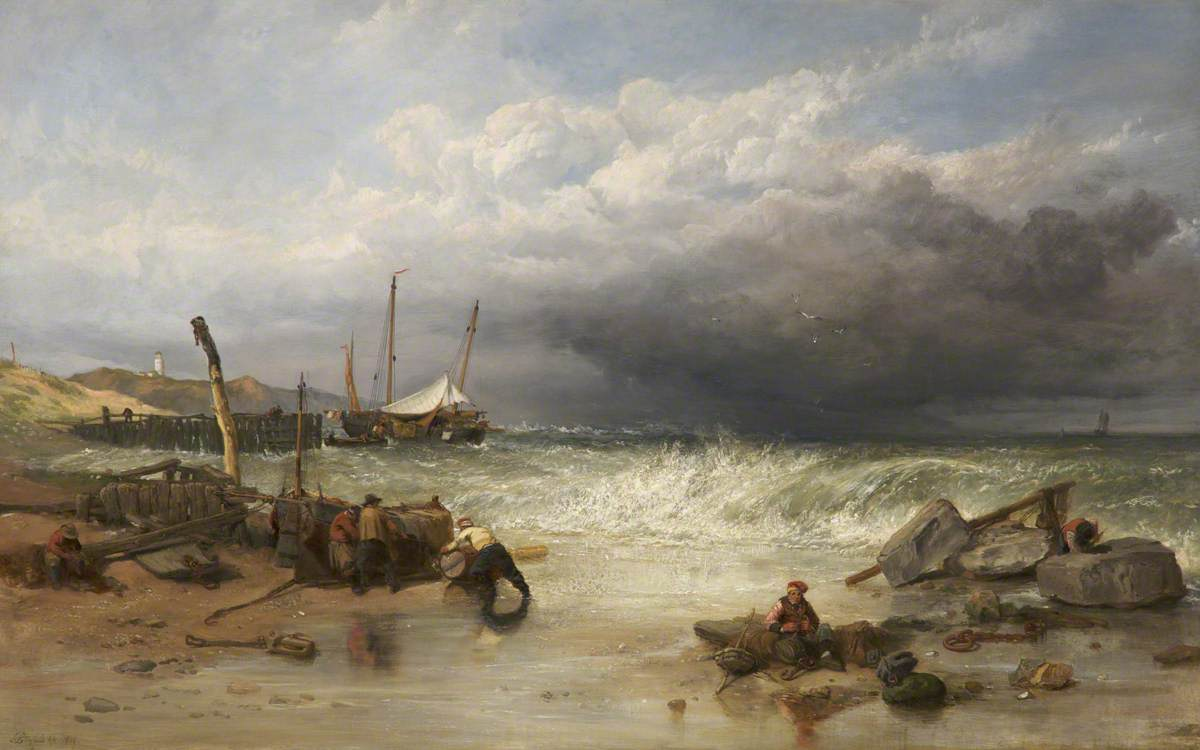
On the Coast of Brittany by Clarkson Stanfield

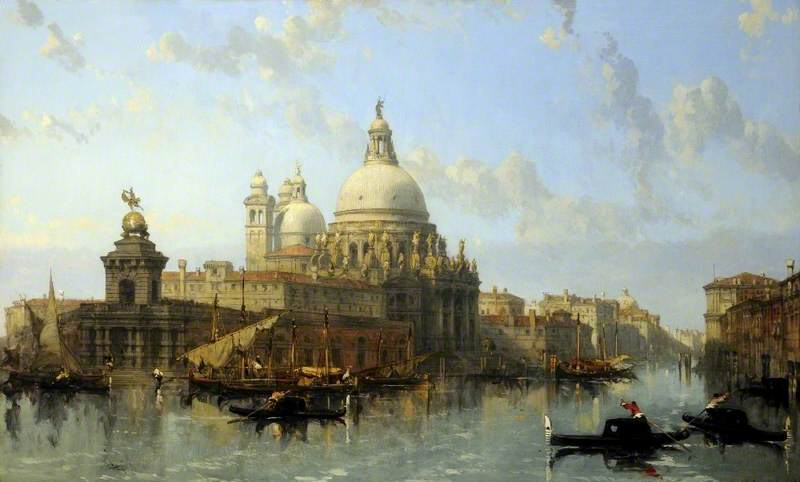
Church of Santa Maria della Salute, Venice by David Roberts

Venice, Trabaccoli Carrying Wood, San Giorgio Maggiore and the Dogana Beyond by Edward William Cooke

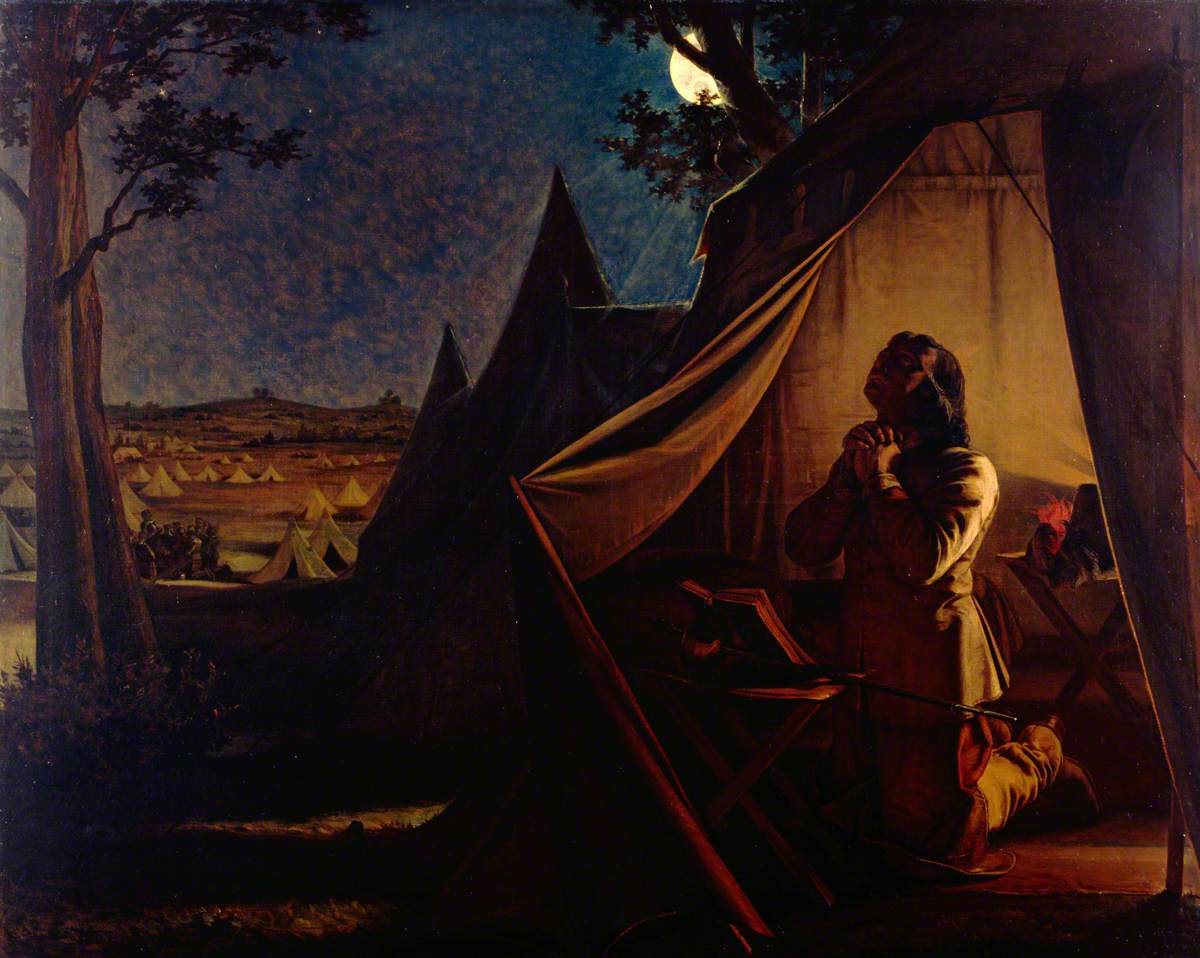
The Night Before Naseby by Augustus Egg

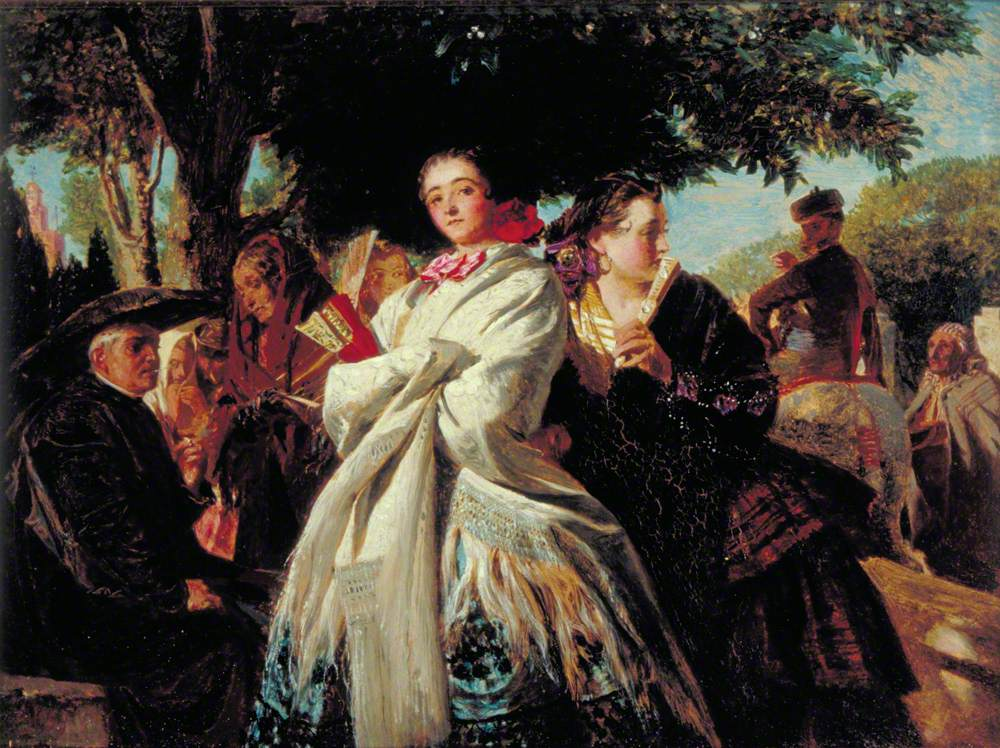
The Huff by John Phillip

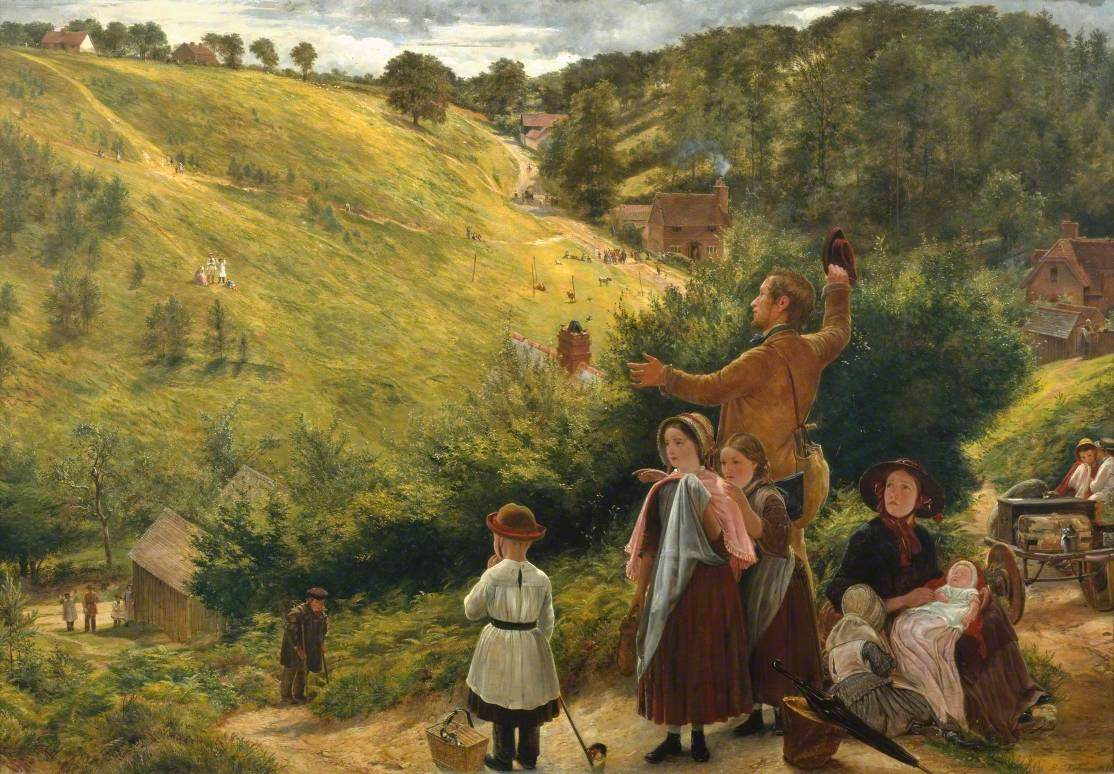
The Emigrant's Last Sight of Home by Richard Redgrave

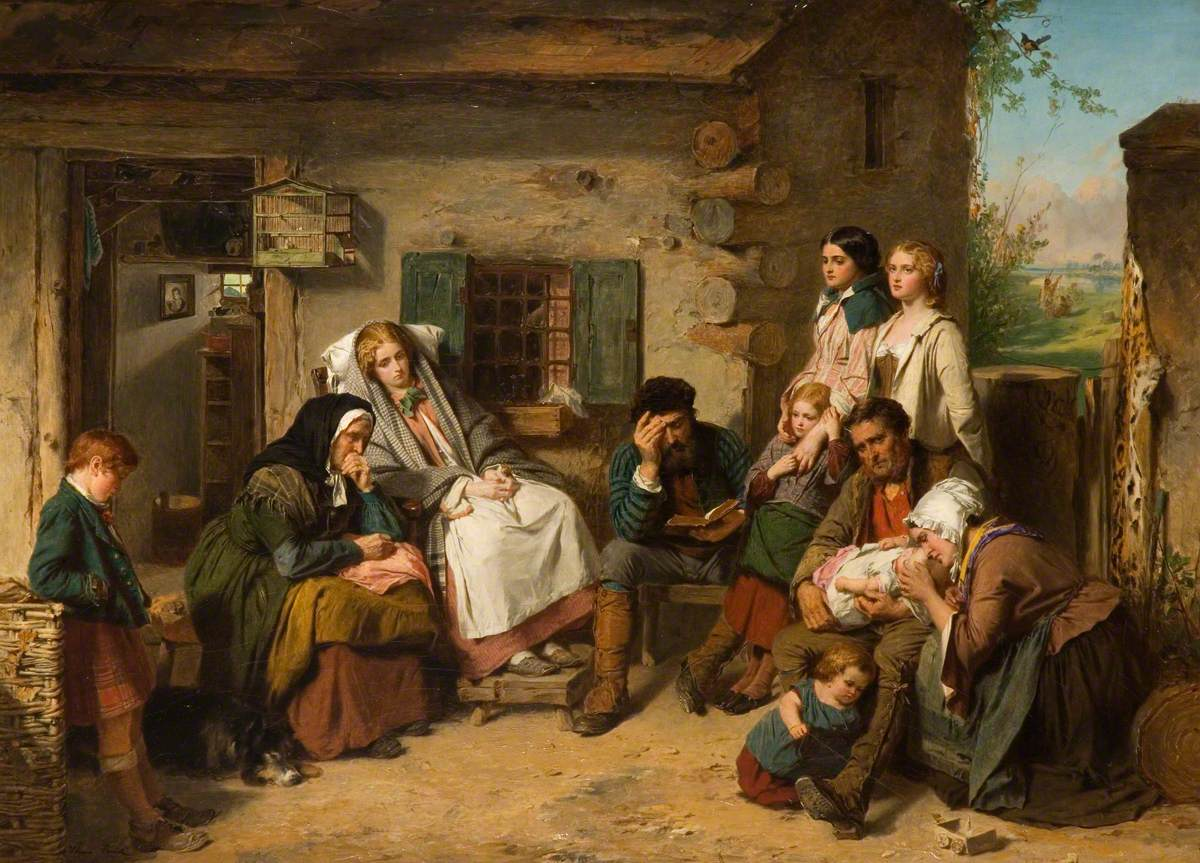
Sunday in the Backwoods by Thomas Faed

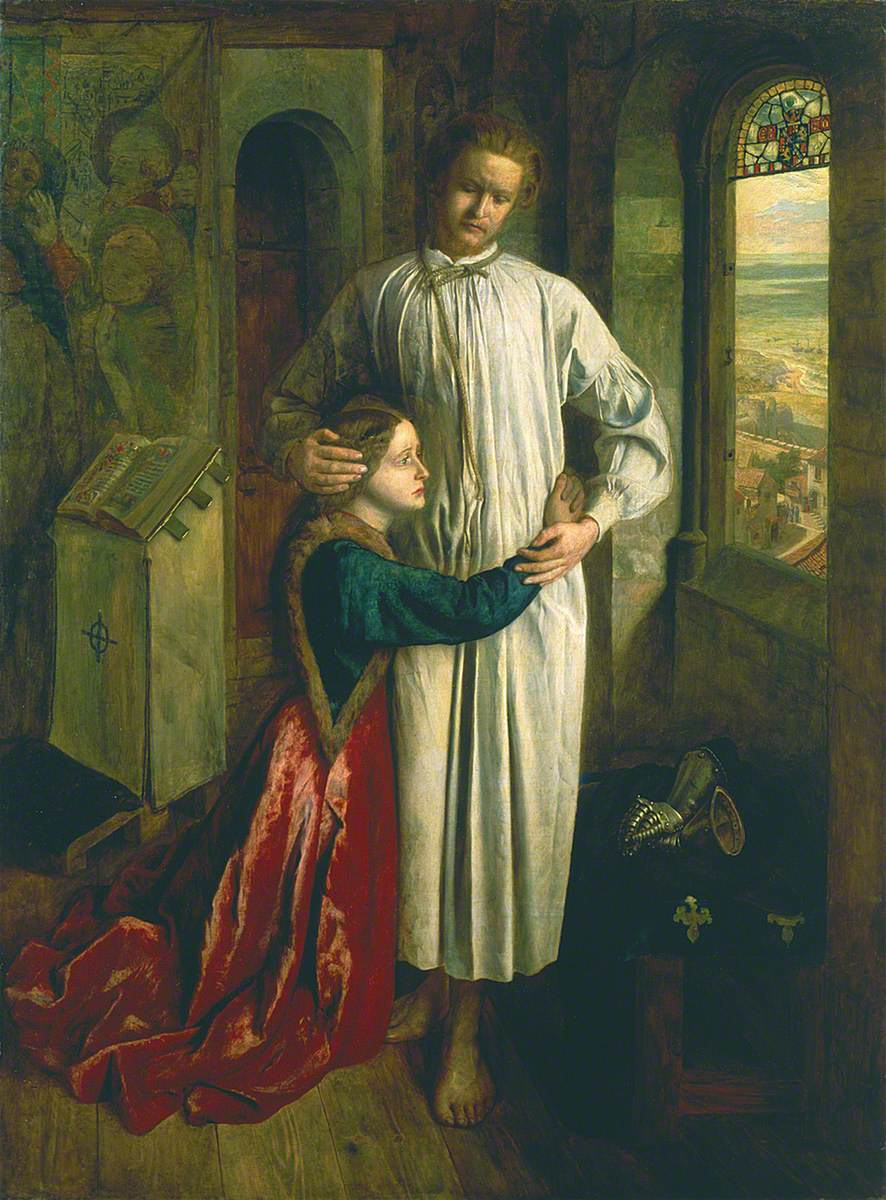
The Burgesses of Calais by Henry Holiday

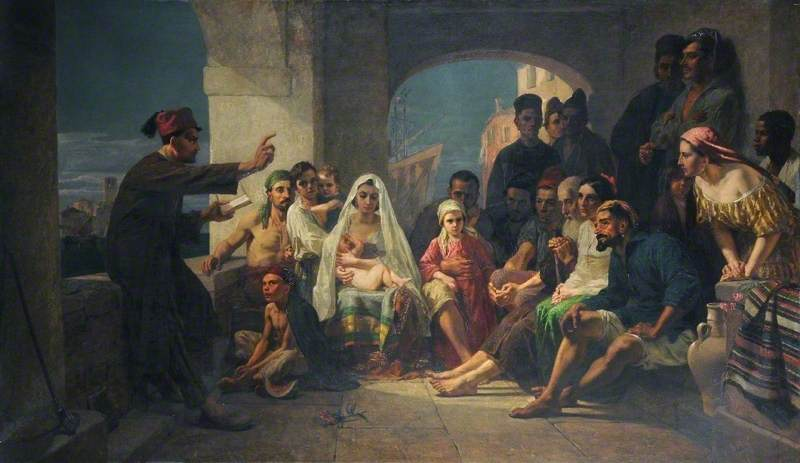
Felice Ballarin Reciting Tasso to the People of Chioggia by Frederick Goodall

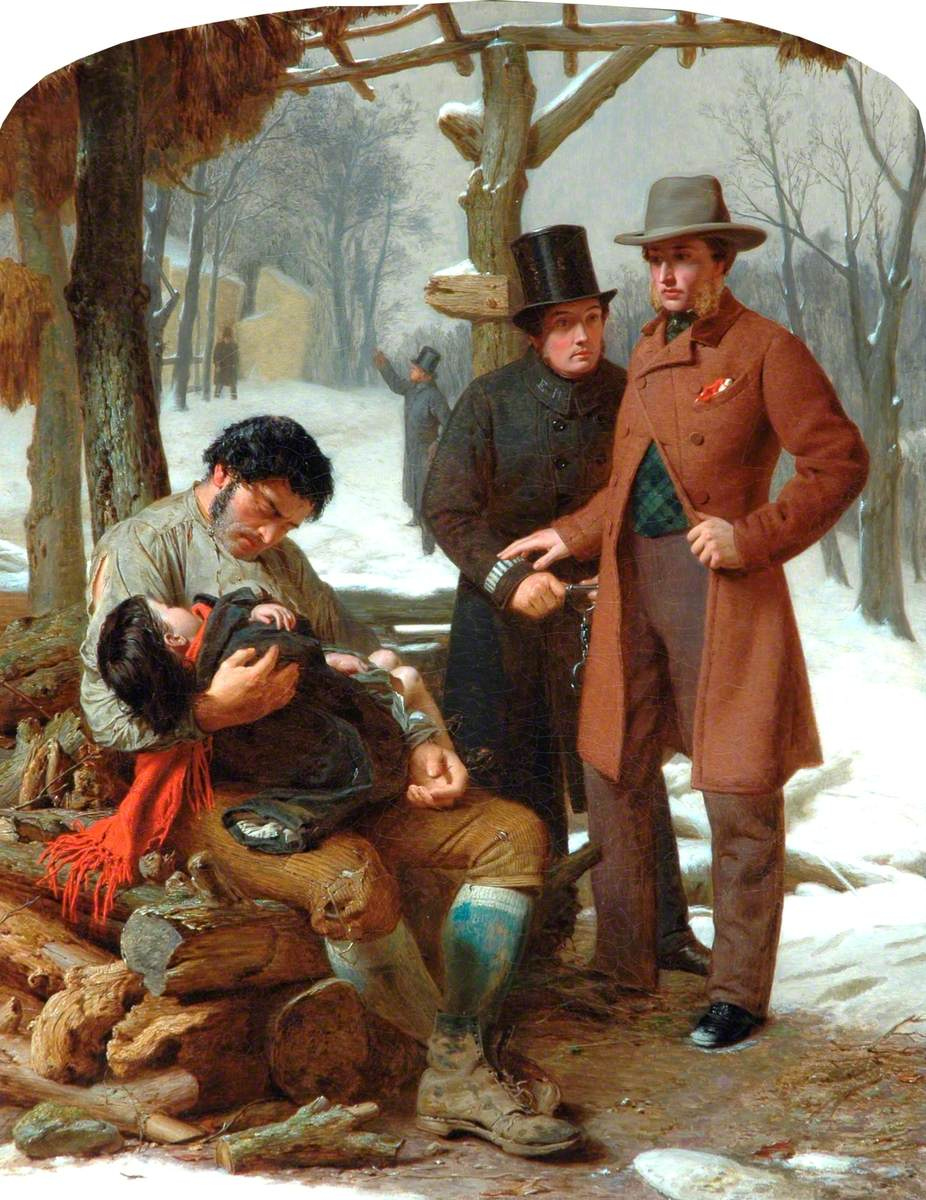
Silent Pleading by Marcus Stone

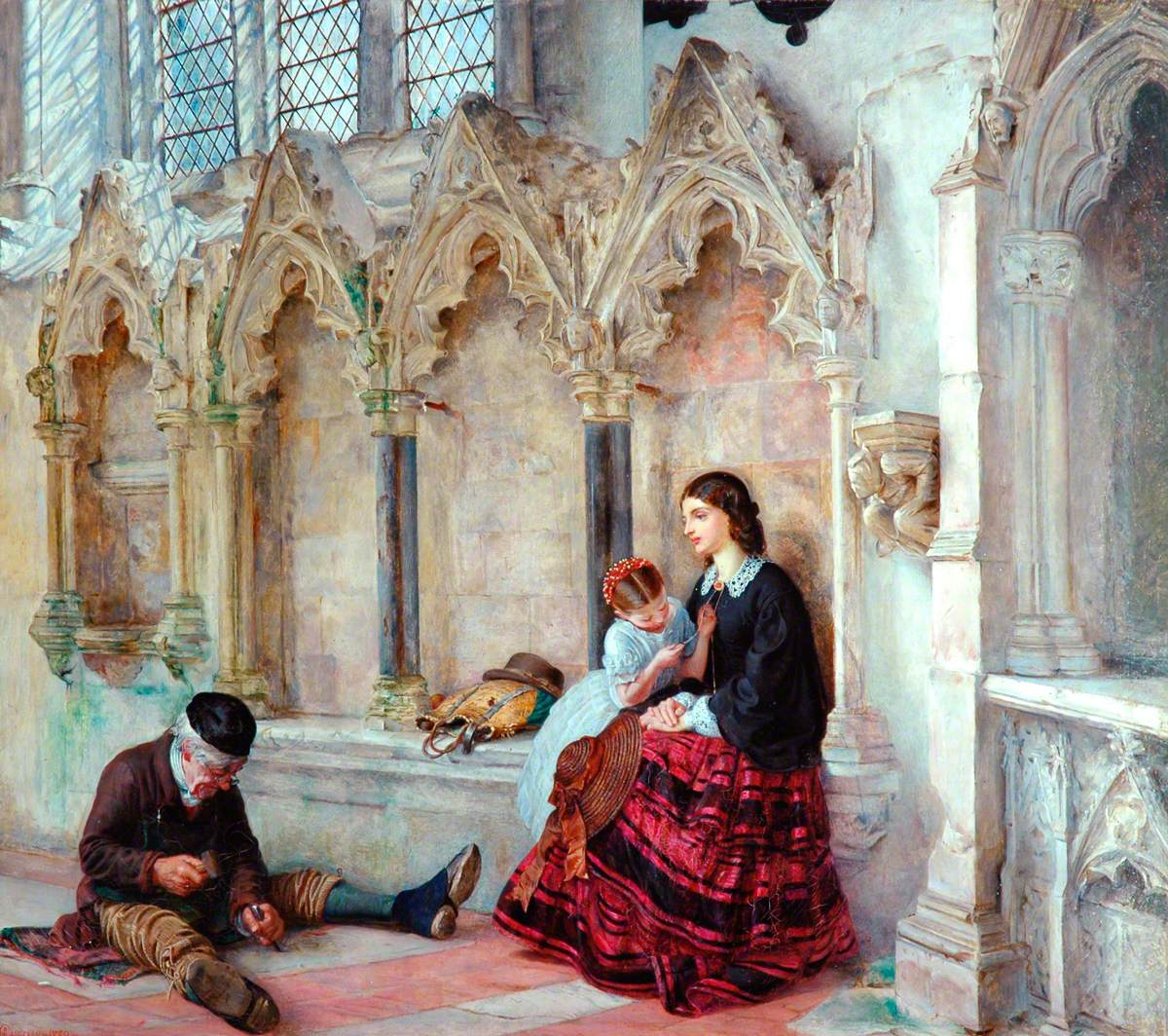
Man Goeth Forth to his Labours by Philip Hermogenes Calderon

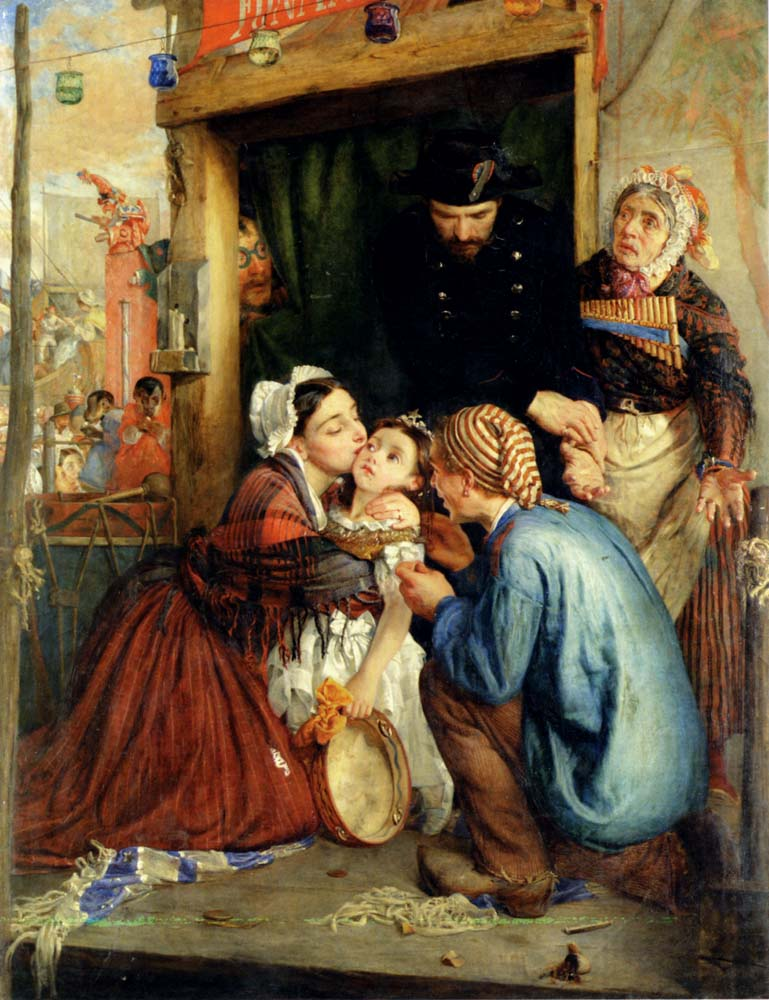
French Peasants Finding Their Stolen Child by Philip Hermogenes Calderon

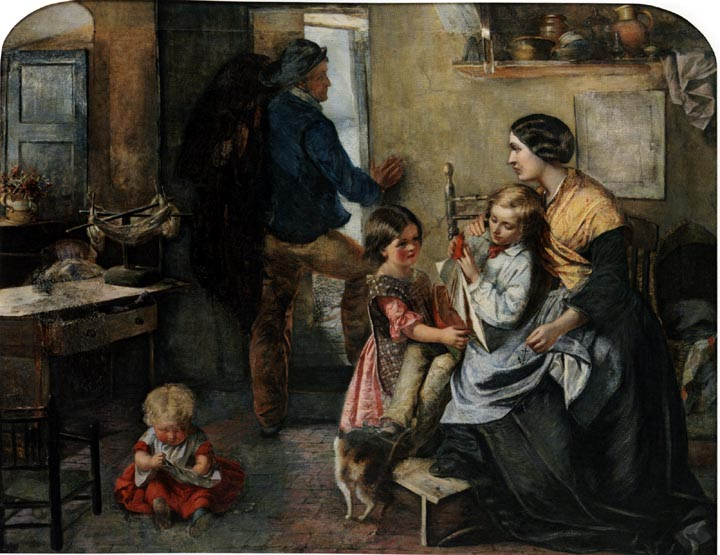
Presentiments by Emily Osborn

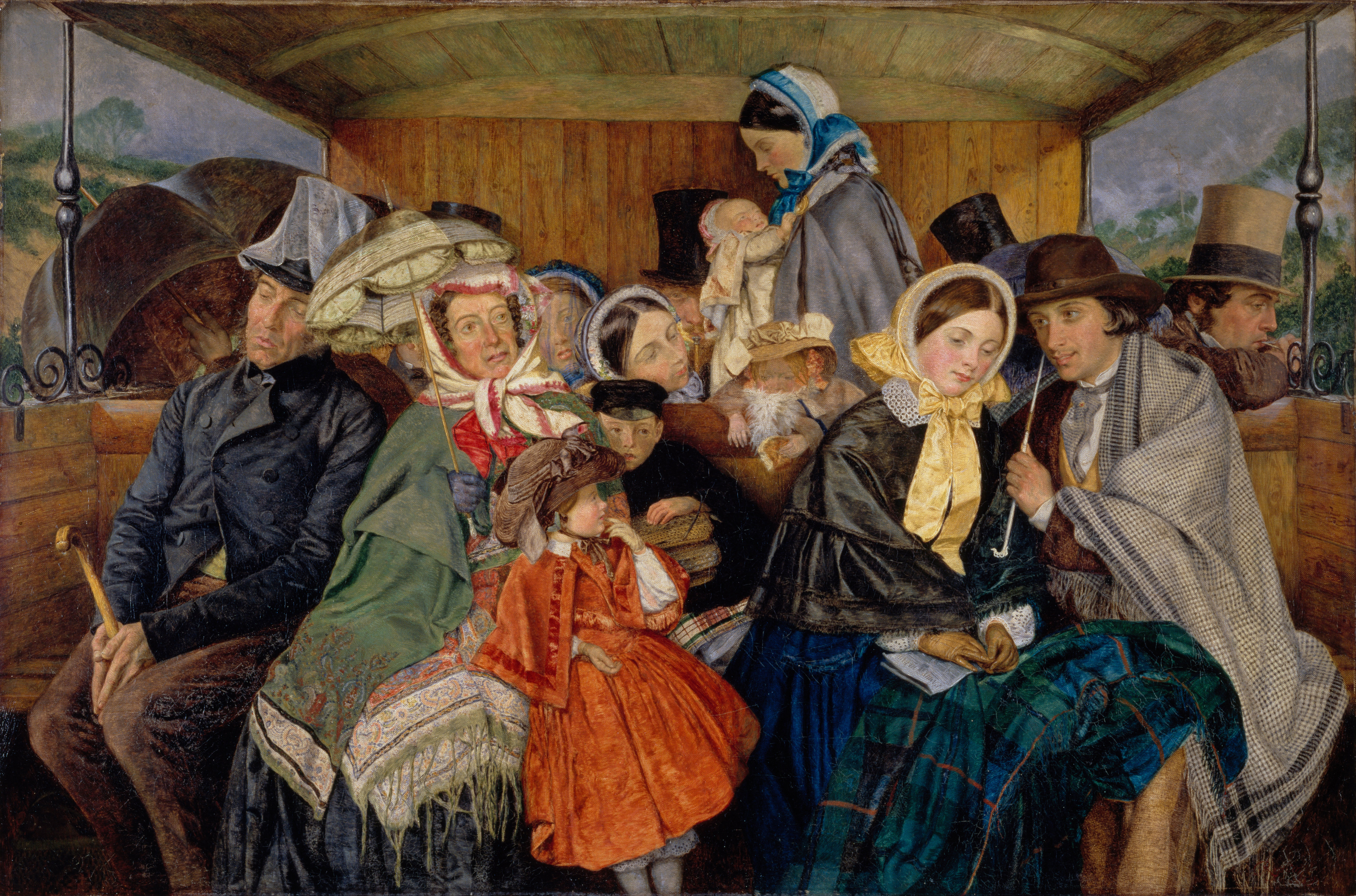
To Brighton and Back by Charles Rossiter

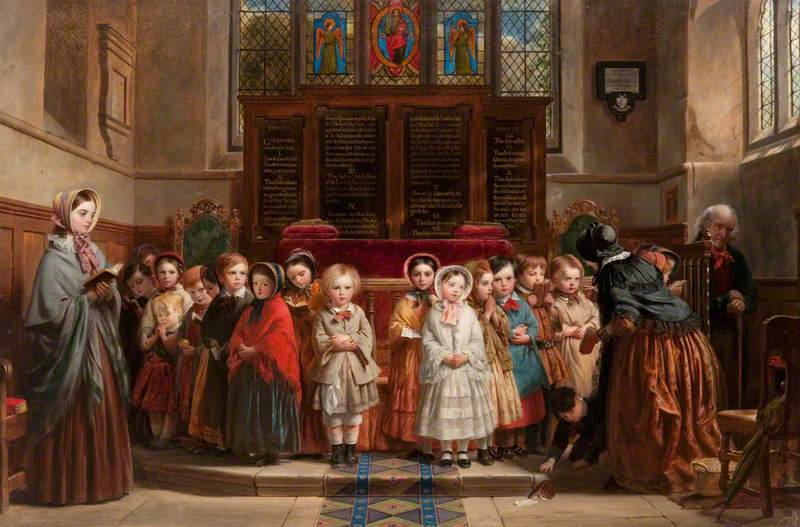
The Sunday School by Robert McInnes

Iseball by George Frederic Watts

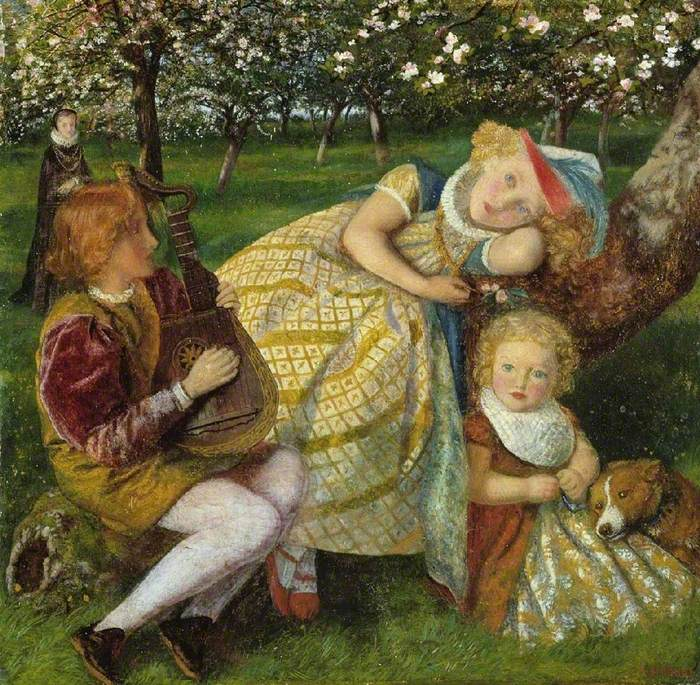
The King's Orchard by Arthur Hughes

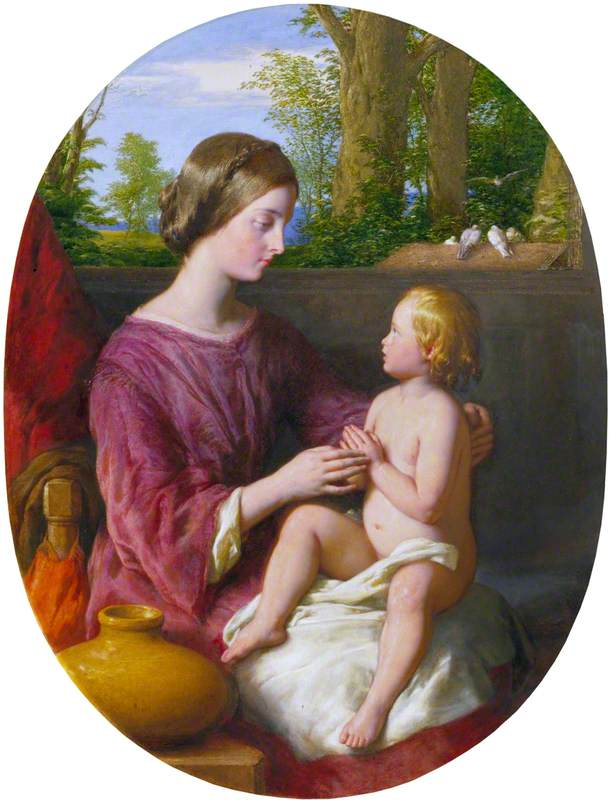
The Lesson by William Mulready

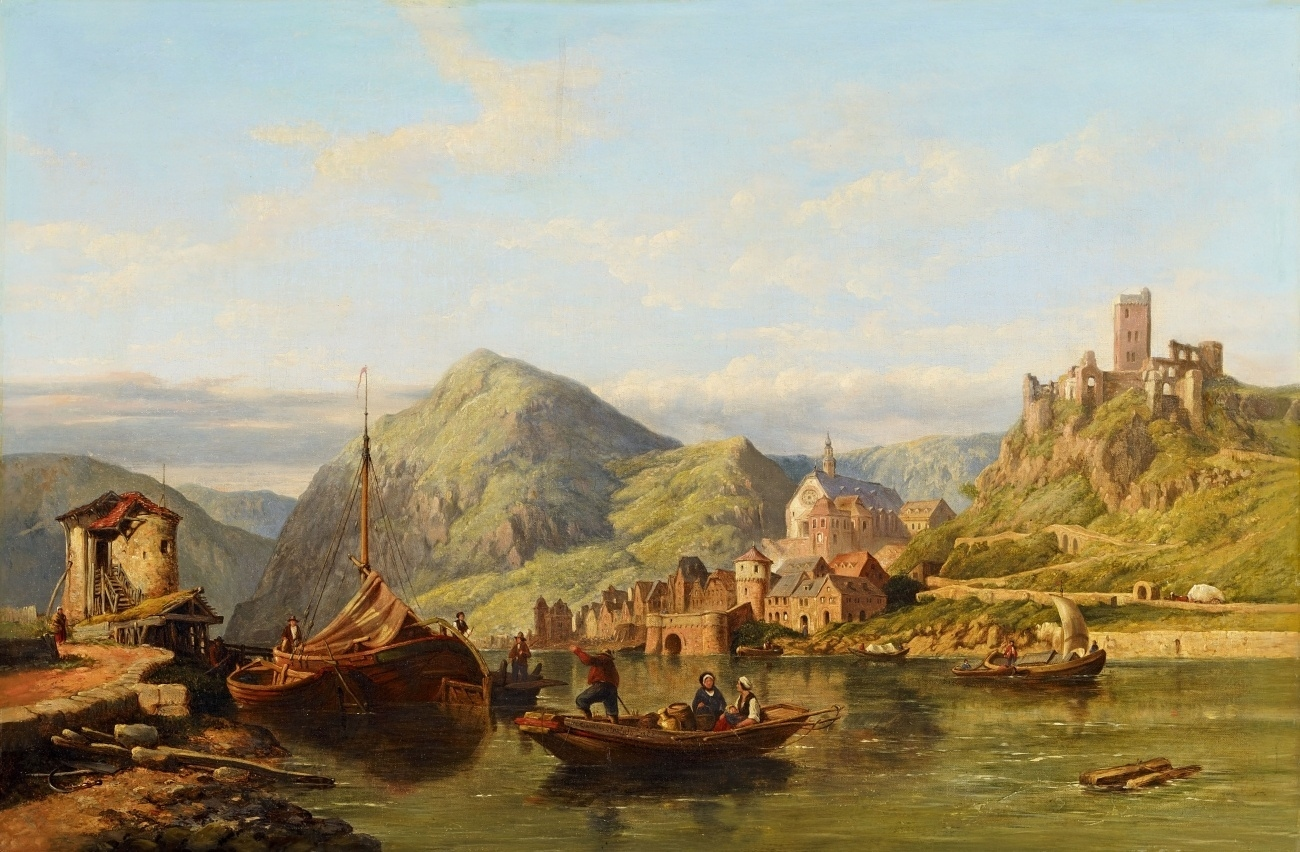
Beilstein on the Moselle by George Stanfield

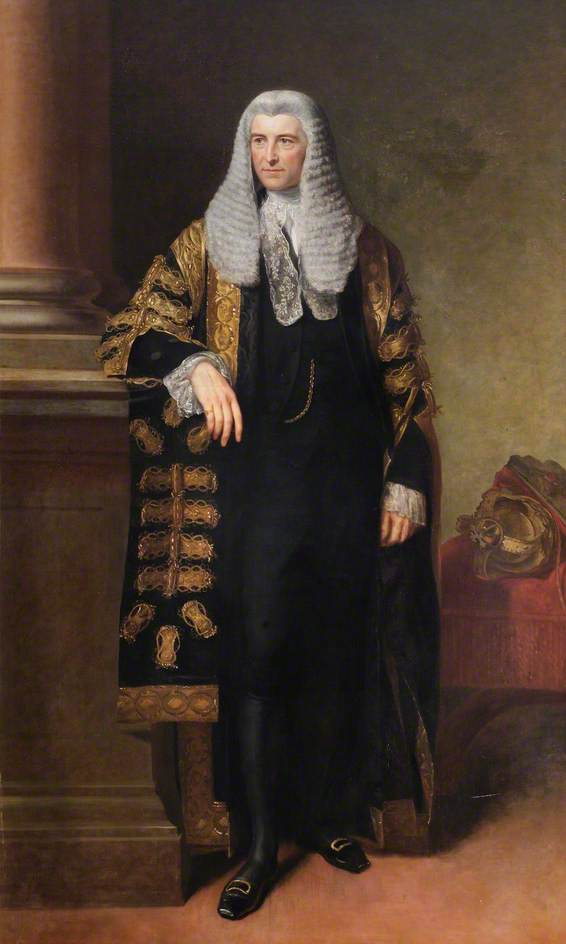
Lord Chelmsford by Eden Upton Eddis

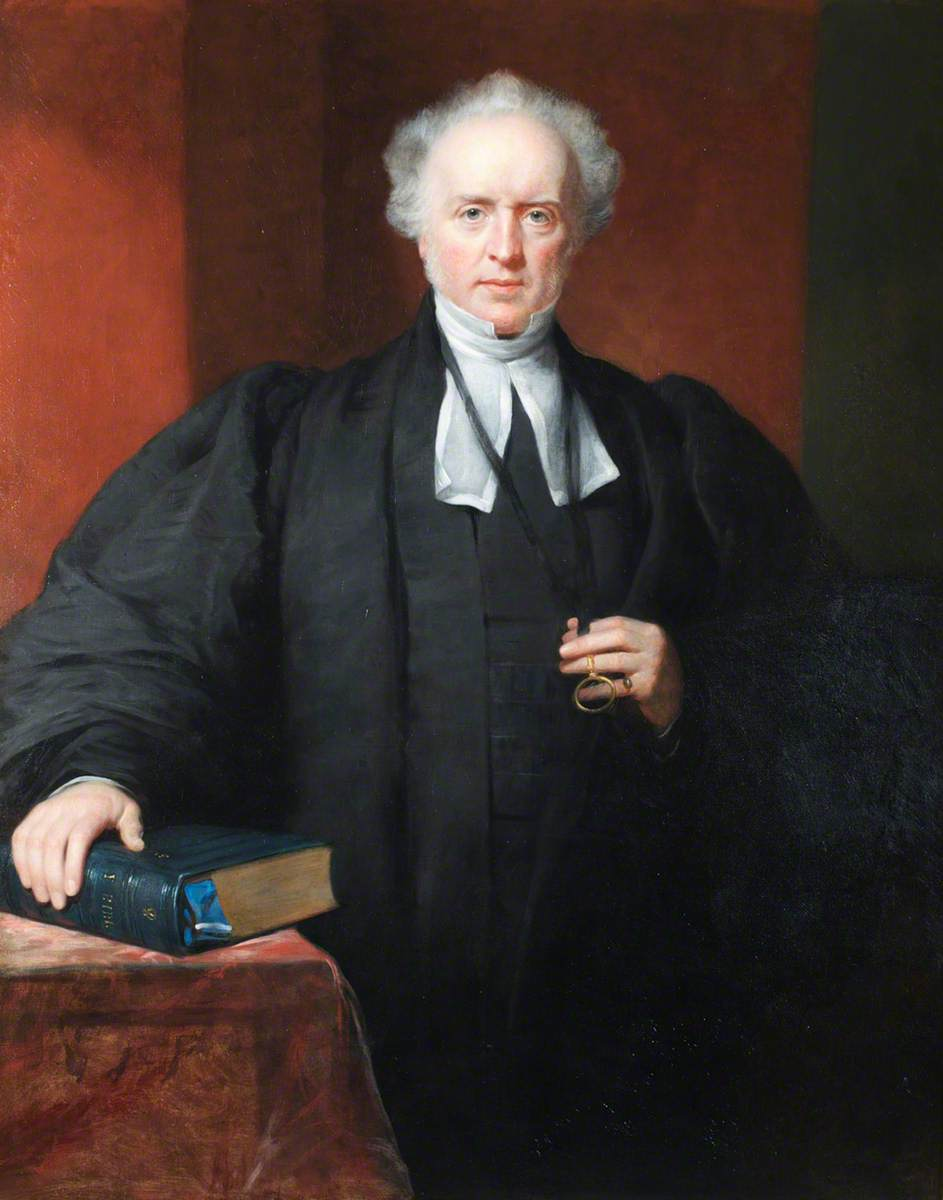
Erasmus Williams by Eden Upton Eddis

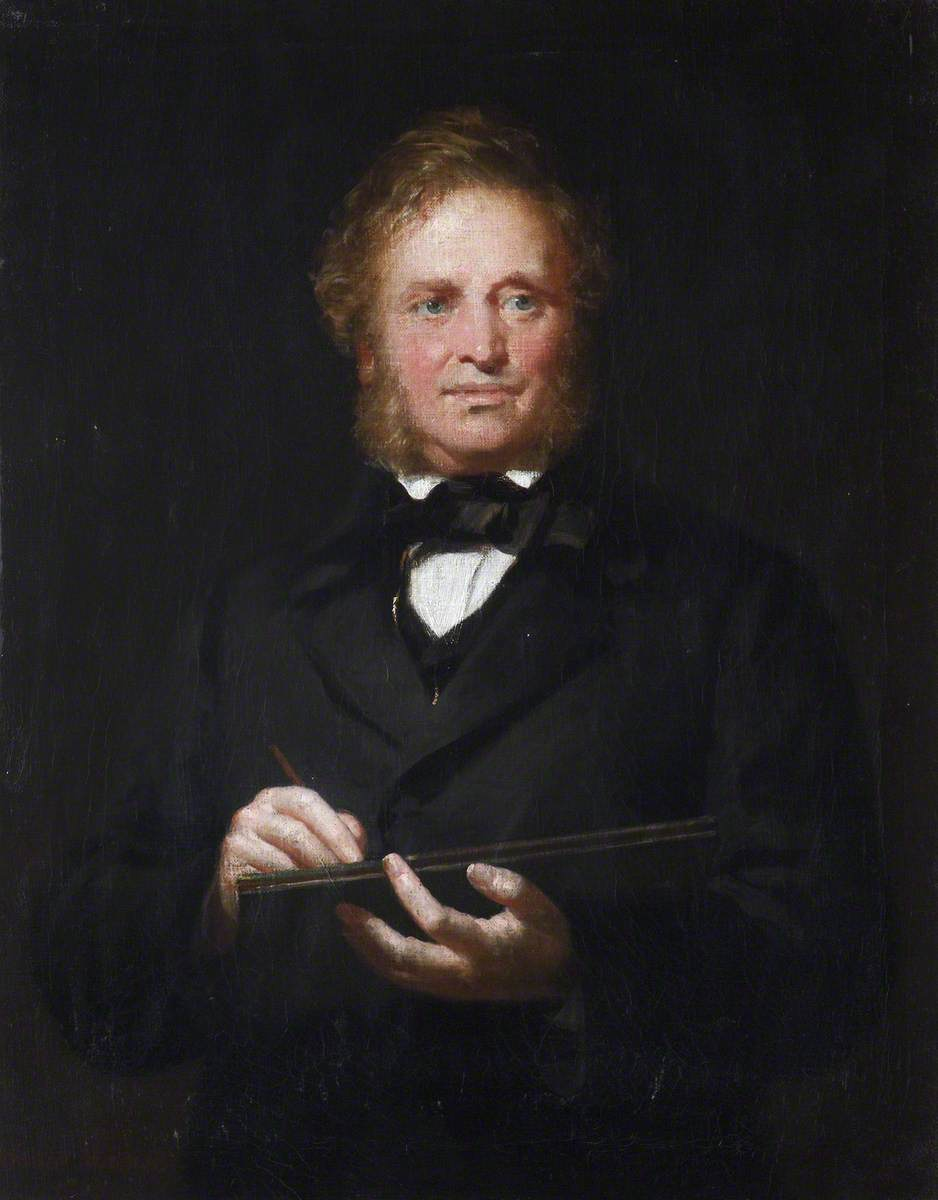
Clarkson Stanfield by Daniel Macnee

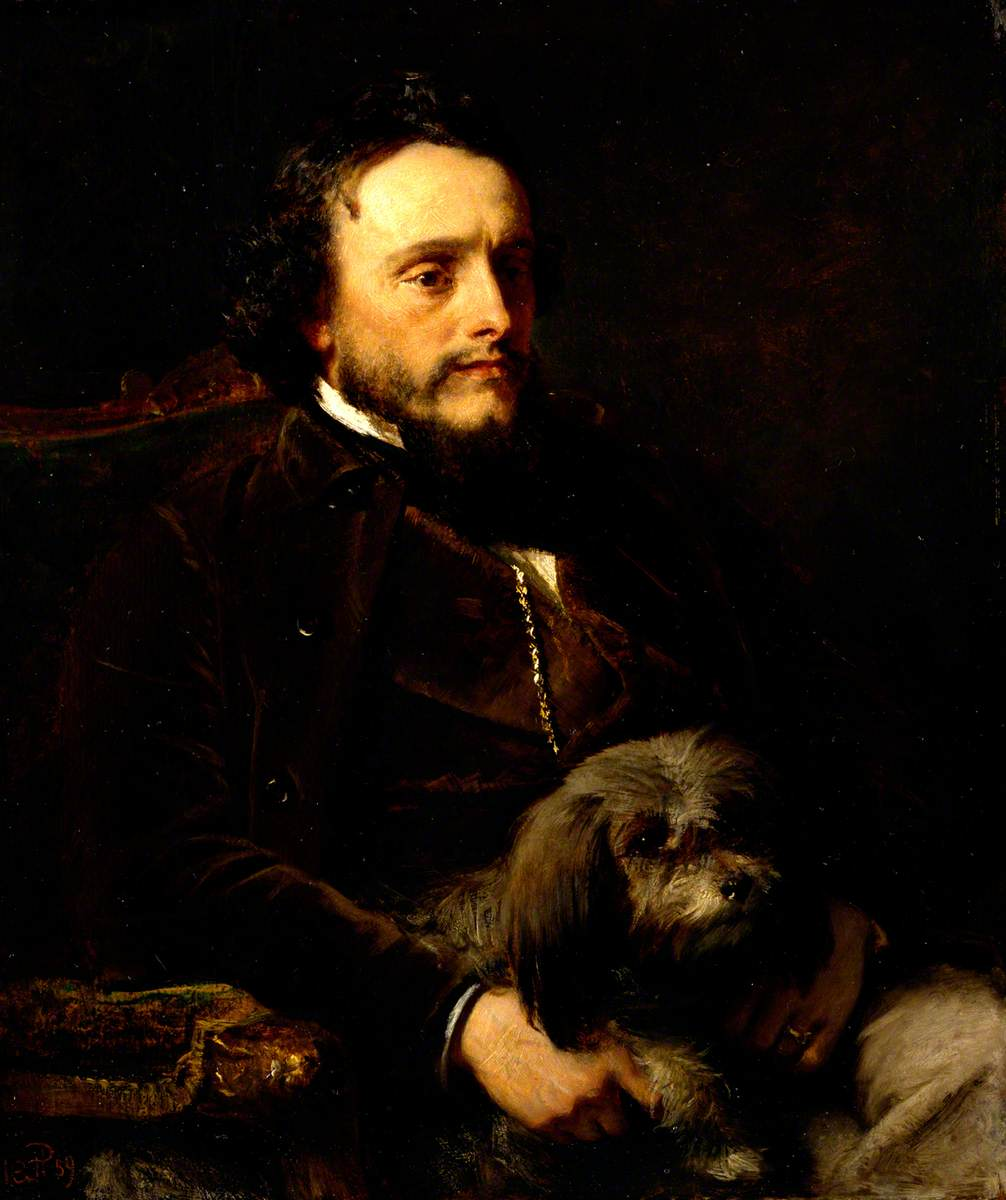
Augustus Leopold Egg by John Phillip

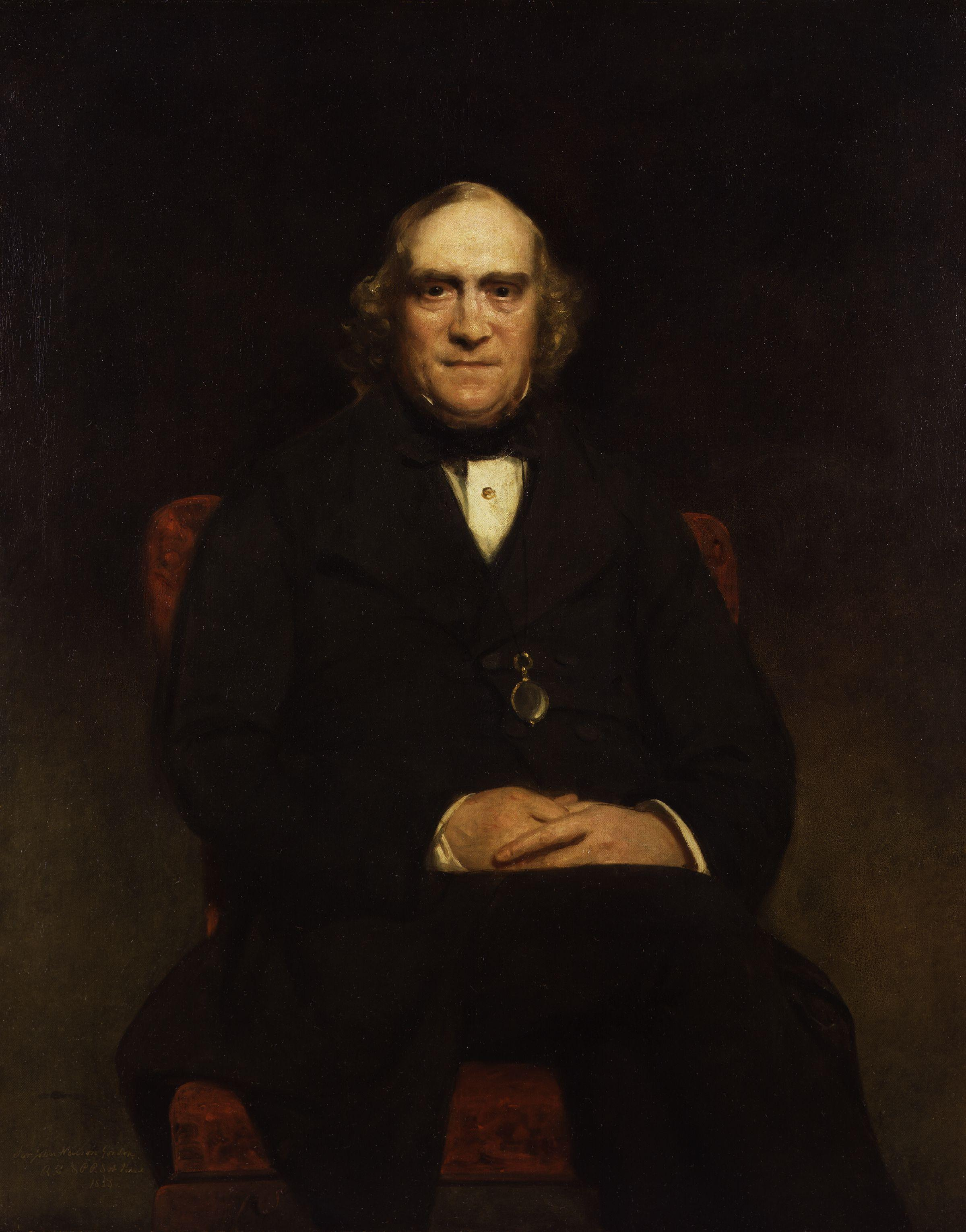
James Wikson by John Watson Gordon

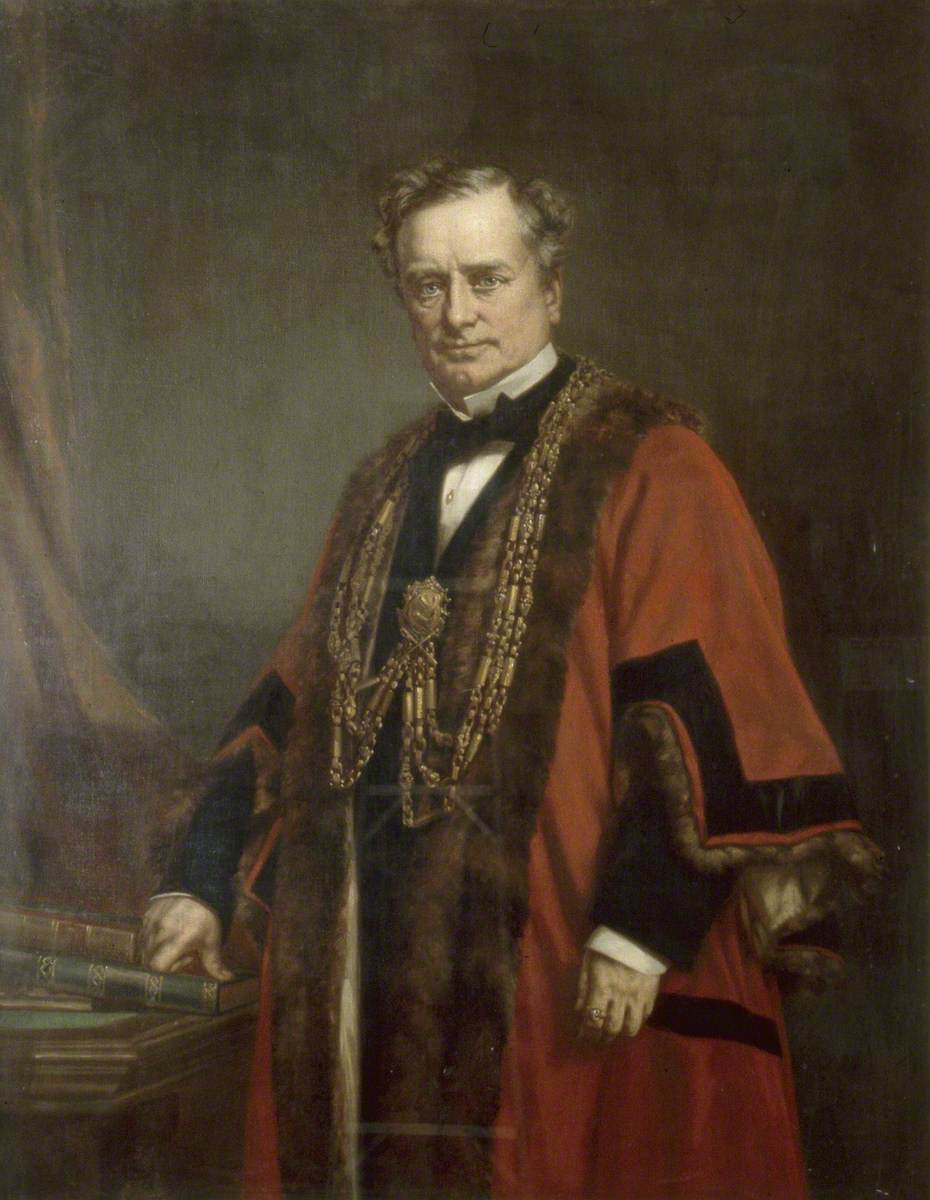
John Cordy Burrows by August Schoefft

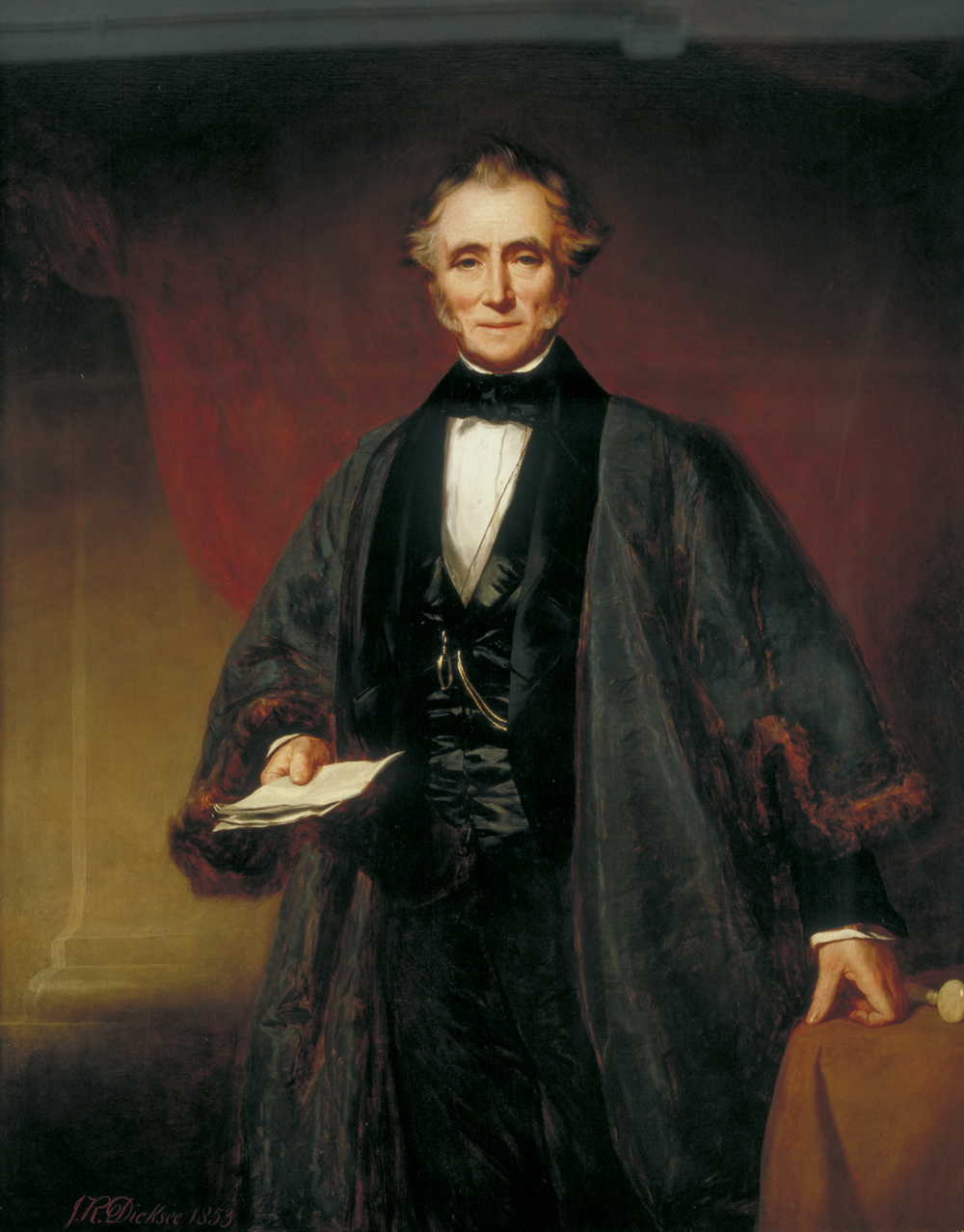
Warren Stormes Hale by John Robert Dicksee

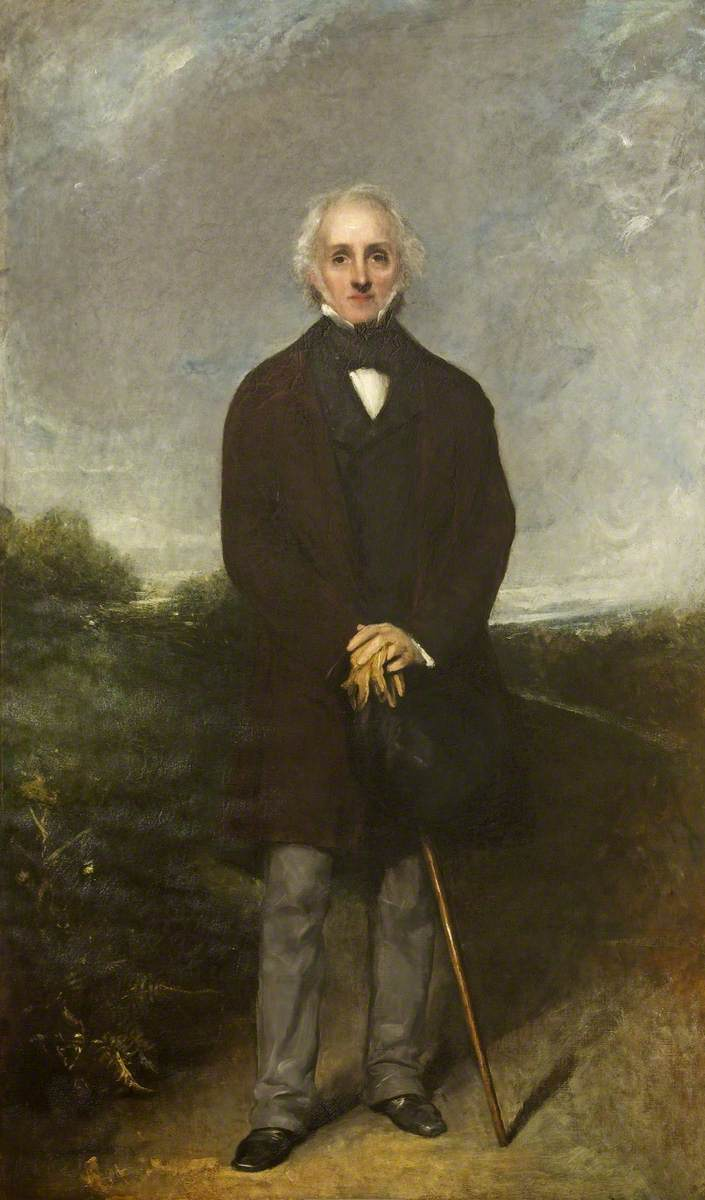
William Gibbs by William Boxall

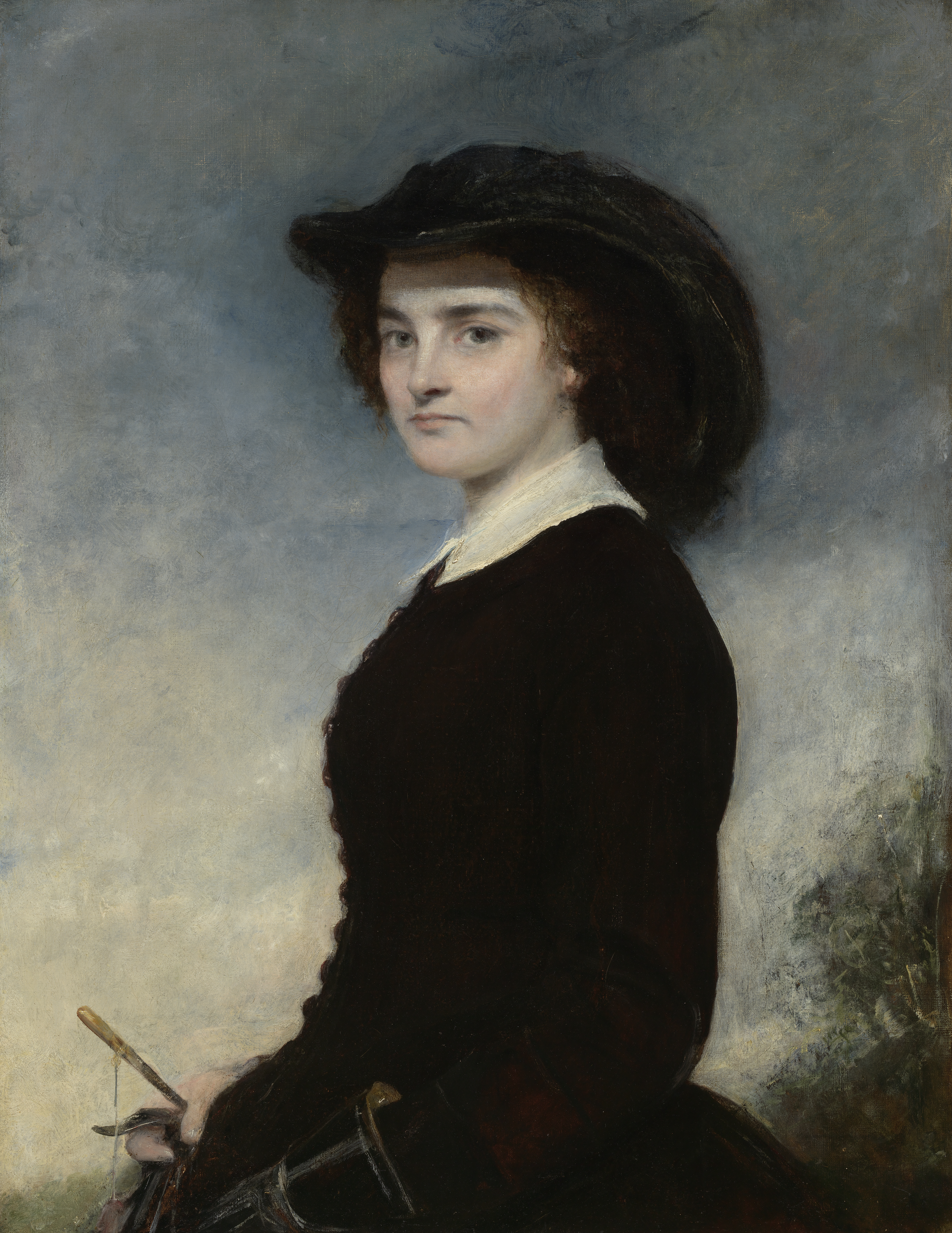
Harriet Goodhue Hosmer by William Boxall

Lord Alfred Paget by Francis Grant

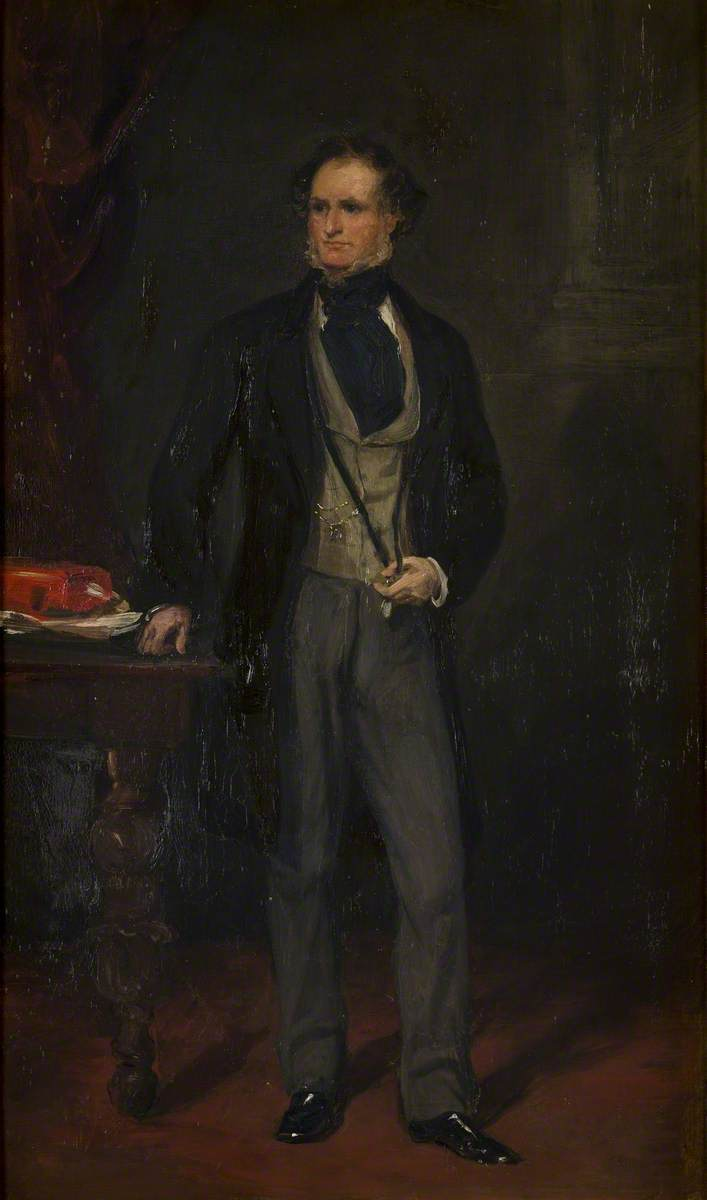
Earl of Derby, study for painting by Francis Grant

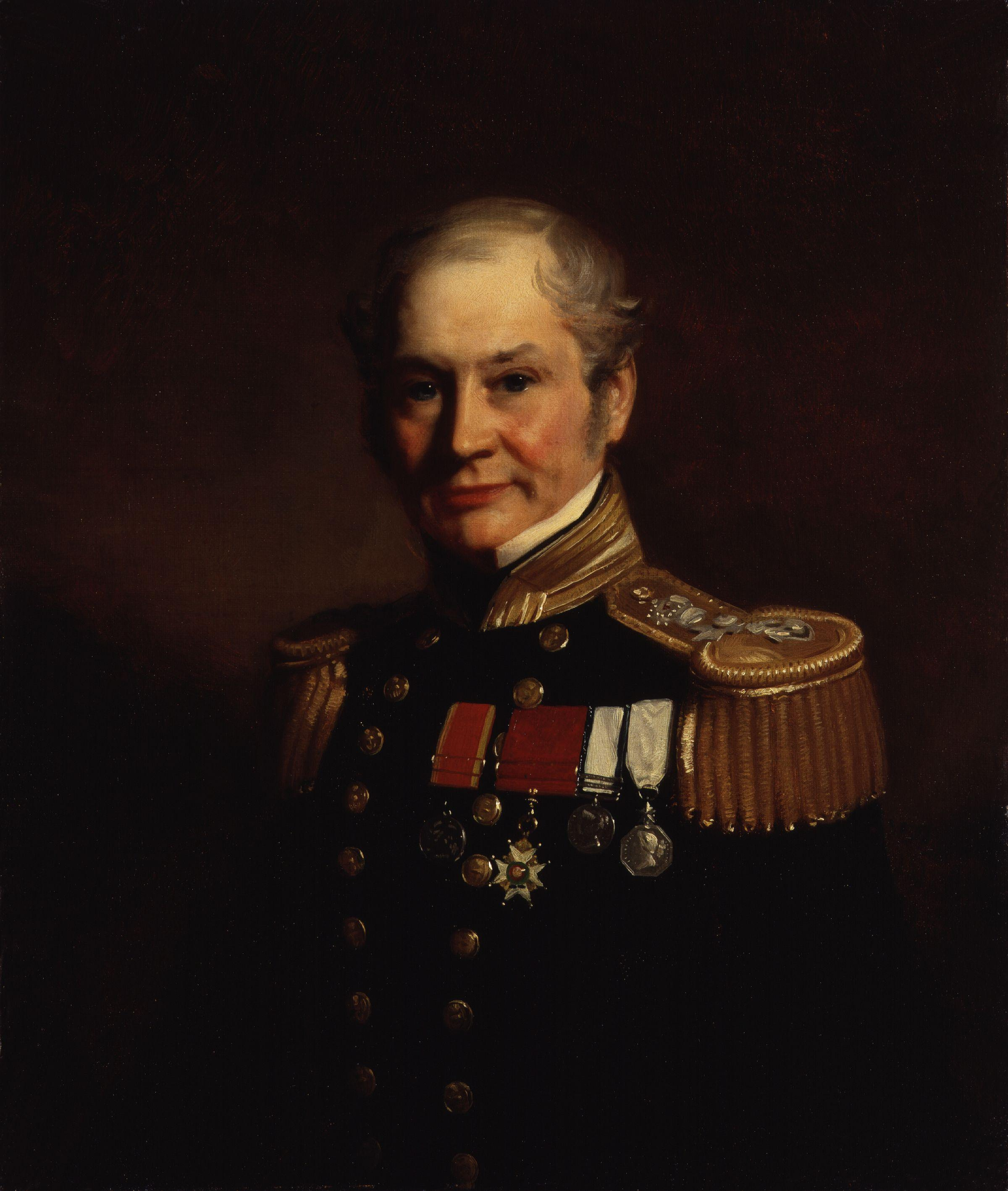
Edward Belcher by Stephen Pearce

== Bibliography ==
- Bayer, Thomas M. & Page, John R. The Development of the Art Market in England: Money as Muse, 1730–1900. Routledge, 2015.
- Kynaston, David. Till Time's Last Sand; A History of the Bank of England 1694-2013. Bloomsbury, 2020.
- Murray, Peter. Daniel Maclise, 1806-1870: Romancing the Past. Crawford Art Gallery, 2009.
- Riding, Christine. John Everett Millais. Harry N. Abrams, 2006.
- Van der Merwe, Pieter & Took, Roger. The Spectacular Career of Clarkson Stanfield. Tyne and Wear County Council Museums, 1979.
