= The Night Before Naseby =

Painting by Augustus Leopold Egg

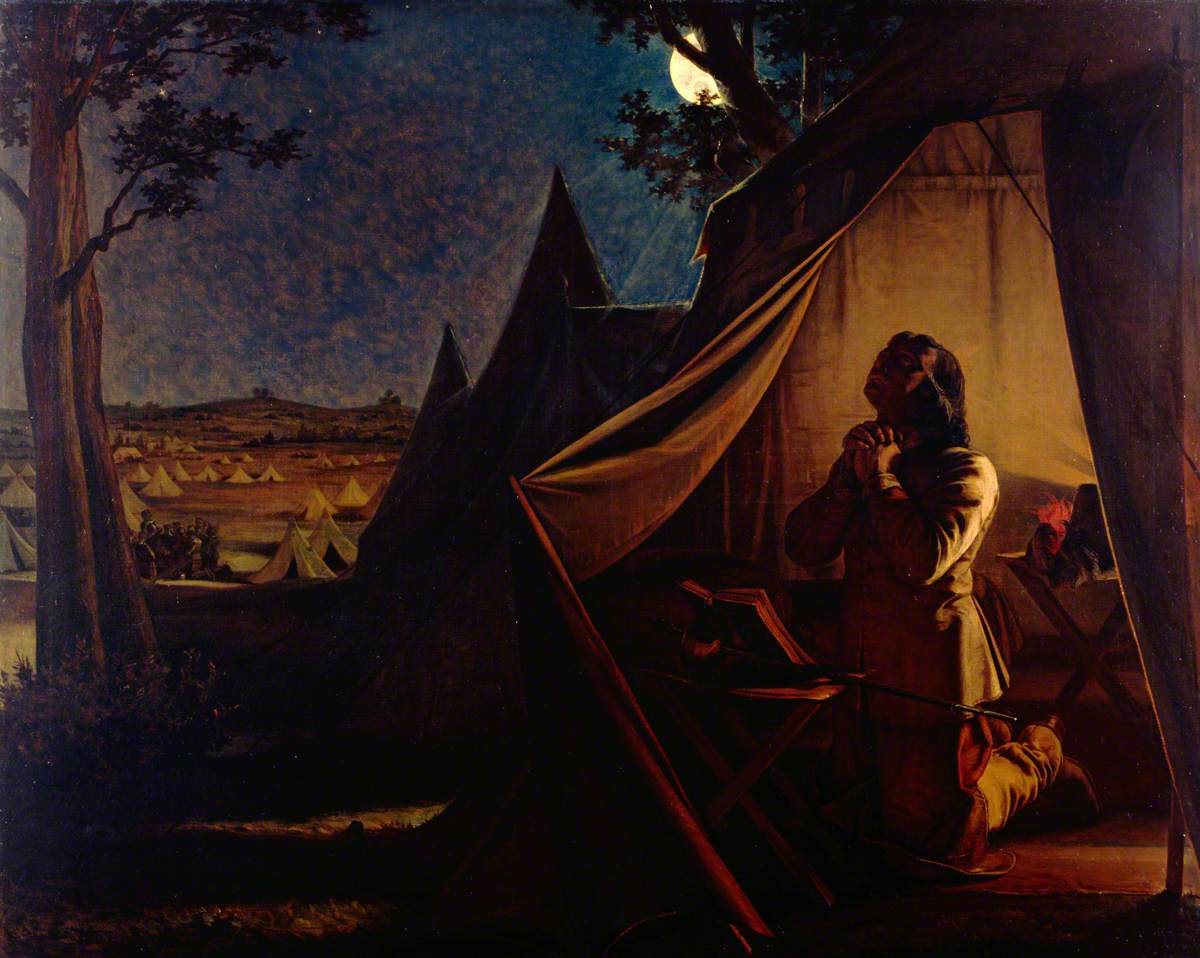
- Artist: Augustus Leopold Egg
- Year: 1859
- Type: Oil on canvas, history painting
- Dimensions: 101.6 cm × 127 cm (40.0 in × 50 in)
- Location: Royal Academy of Arts, London

The Night Before Naseby is an 1859 history painting by the British artist Augustus Leopold Egg. It depicts Oliver Cromwell in his tent praying before the Battle of Naseby. The following day, 14 June 1645, Cromwell served as second-in-command of the New Model Army under Thomas Fairfax in a decisive victory over the Royalist forces of Charles I during the English Civil War. Paintings such as this were part of a wider depiction as a noble, heroic figure during the Victorian era. Shown in moonlight, Cromwell's stance resembles the Agony in the Garden

The painting as displayed at the Royal Academy Exhibition of 1859 held at the National Gallery in London. Egg was elected to full membership of the Royal Academy of Arts in 1860 and was required to submit a diploma work. As he hadn't supplied one before his death in French Algeria in 1863, this picture was chosen by his executors. It remains in the Royal Academy collection.

== Bibliography ==
- Bann, Stephen. Scenes and Traces of the English Civil War. Reaktion Books, 2020.
- Casteras, Stephen P. The Defining Moment: Victorian Narrative Paintings from the Forbes Magazine Collection. Mint Museum of Art, 1999.
- Karsten, Peter. Patriot-Heroes in England and America: Political Symbolism and Changing Values Over Three Centuries . University of Wisconsin Press, 1978.
- Richards, Jeffrey. Sir Henry Irving: A Victorian Actor and His World. Bloomsbury Academic, 2007.
- Strong, Roy. Painting the Past: The Victorian Painter and British History. Pimlico, 2004.
