= Portrait of Charles Dickens =

Painting by Daniel Maclise

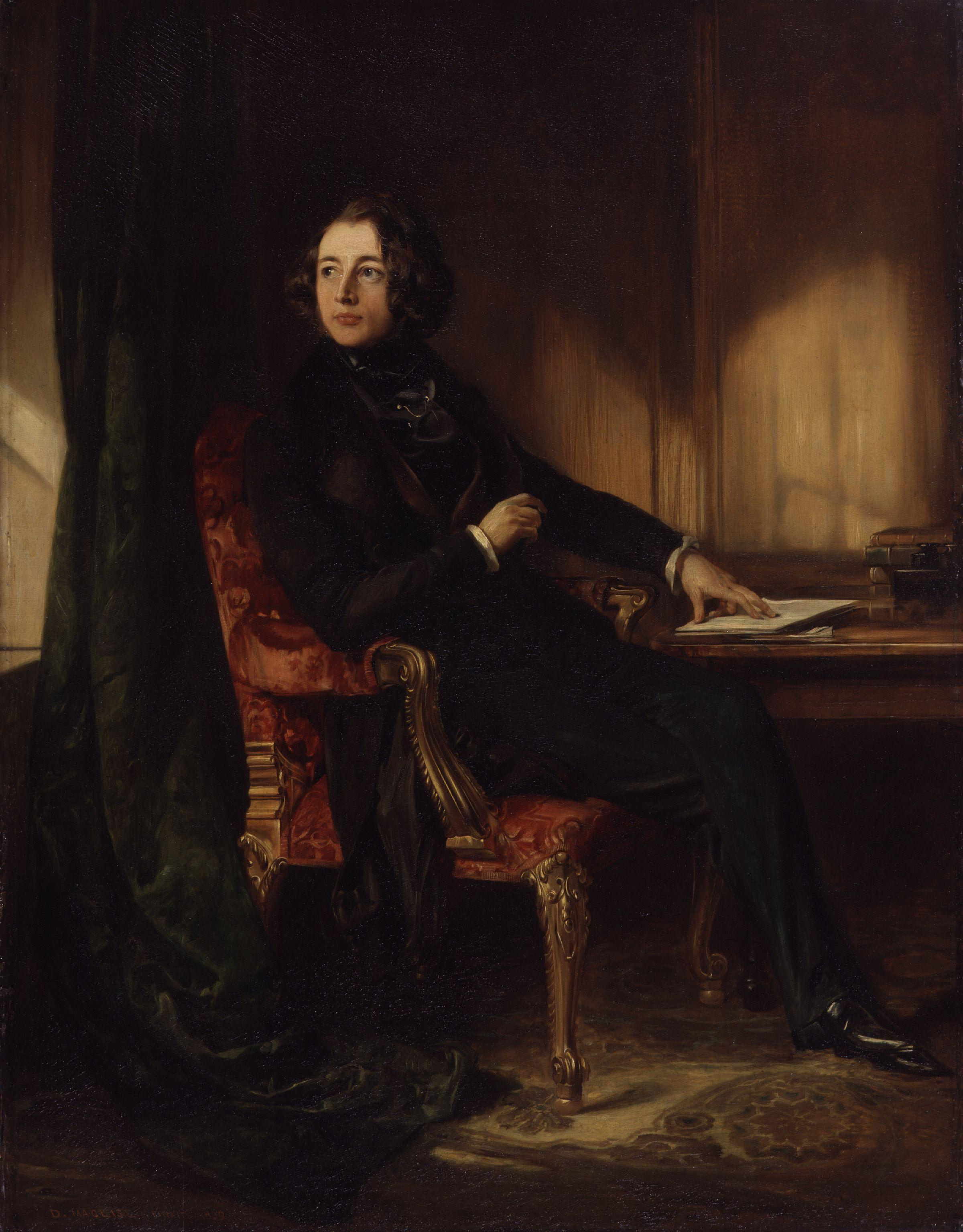
- Artist: Daniel Maclise
- Year: 1839
- Type: Oil on canvas, portrait painting
- Dimensions: 91.4 cm × 71.4 cm (36.0 in × 28.1 in)
- Location: National Portrait Gallery, London

Portrait of Charles Dickens is an oil on canvas portrait painting by the Irish artist Daniel Maclise, from 1839. It is a depiction of the English novelist Charles Dickens, still in his youth. Dickens's debut novel The Pickwick Papers had been a popular success, which he had followed up with Nicholas Nickleby. He was around twenty-seven when he sat for the painting, which is sometimes known as Young Dickens.

The painting depicts Dickens sitting at a writing table and was generally considered a "good likeness". It was used for the frontispiece of his third novel Nicholas Nickleby. Today it is in the collection of the National Portrait Gallery, in London, having been transferred from the Tate Galleries in 2012. An engraving based on the painting was produced by Edward Francis Finden.

== See also ==
- Charles Dickens in His Study, an 1859 portrait by William Powell Frith

== Bibliography ==
- Murray, Peter. Daniel Maclise, 1806-1870: Romancing the Past. Crawford Art Gallery, 2008.
- Schlicke, Paul (ed.) The Oxford Companion to Charles Dickens: Anniversary Edition. OUP Oxford, 2011.
- Weston, Nancy. Daniel Maclise: Irish Artist in Victorian London. Four Courts Press, 2001.
- Choe, Jian,“'Storms and Vicissitudes’: The Portraits of Charles Dickens", The Dickensian, No. 525. Vol. 121, Spring 2025.
