= On the Coast of Brittany =

Painting by Clarkson Stanfield

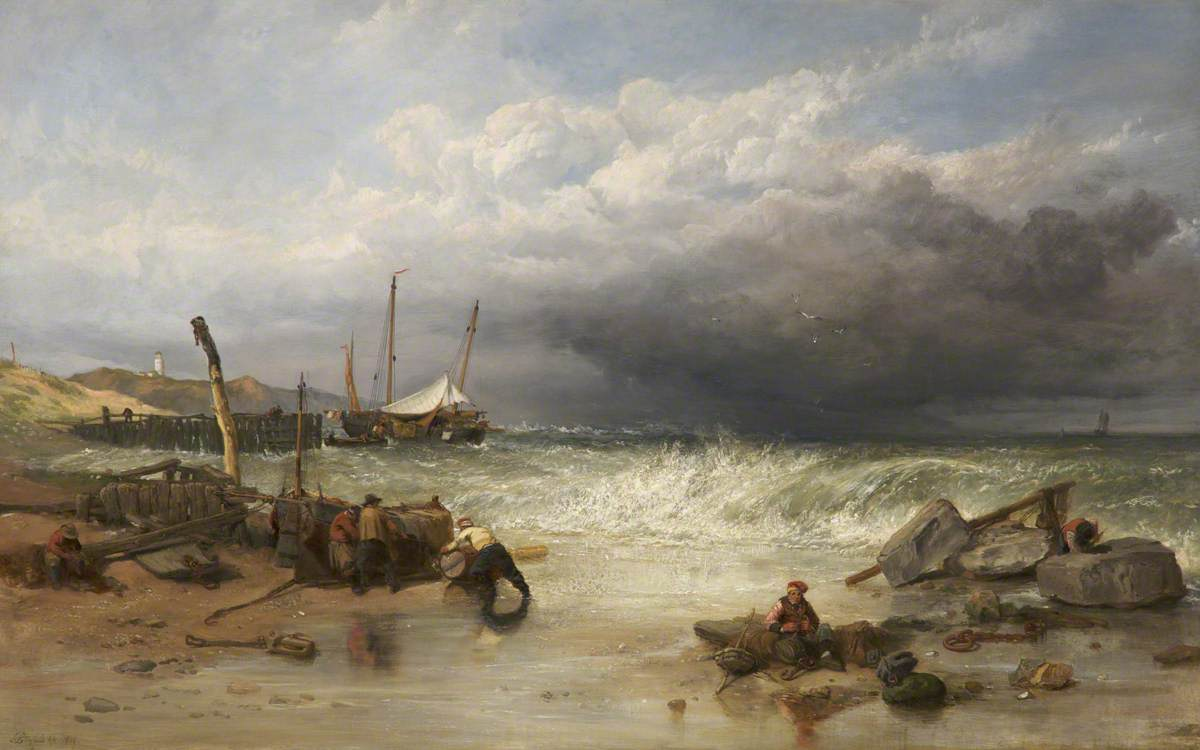
- Artist: Clarkson Stanfield
- Year: 1858
- Medium: Oil on canvas, landscape painting
- Dimensions: 75 cm × 120.5 cm (30 in × 47.4 in)
- Location: Bury Art Museum, Greater Manchester

On the Coast of Brittany is an 1858 oil painting by the British artist Clarkson Stanfield. A combination of landscape and seascape, it features a view on the coastline of Brittany in the west of France, near Dol-de-Bretagne. As with much of his work the turbulent weather and sea is part of the Romantic tradition. The picture was produced in the latter stages of his career, after he had enjoyed great success at the Salon of 1855 in Paris where he was awarded a gold medal. The painting was displayed at the Royal Academy Exhibition of 1859 held at the National Gallery in London.

It was acquired by the art collector Thomas Wrigley for £1,320 in 1863, whose family later presented it to the Bury Art Museum as part of a major gift to mark the Diamond Jubilee of Queen Victoria in 1897.

== Bibliography ==
- Cooper-Richet, Diana. La France anglaise, de la Révolution à nos jours. Fayard, 2018.
- Martineau, Jane & Foster, Michael. Art Treasures of England: The Regional Collections. Merrell Holberton, 1998.
- Van der Merwe, Pieter & Took, Roger. The Spectacular career of Clarkson Stanfield. Tyne and Wear County Council Museums, 1979.
- Wright, Christopher, Gordon, Catherine May & Smith, Mary Peskett. British and Irish Paintings in Public Collections: An Index of British and Irish Oil Paintings by Artists Born Before 1870 in Public and Institutional Collections in the United Kingdom and Ireland. Yale University Press, 2006.
