= Doubtful Crumbs =

Painting by Edwin Henry Landseer

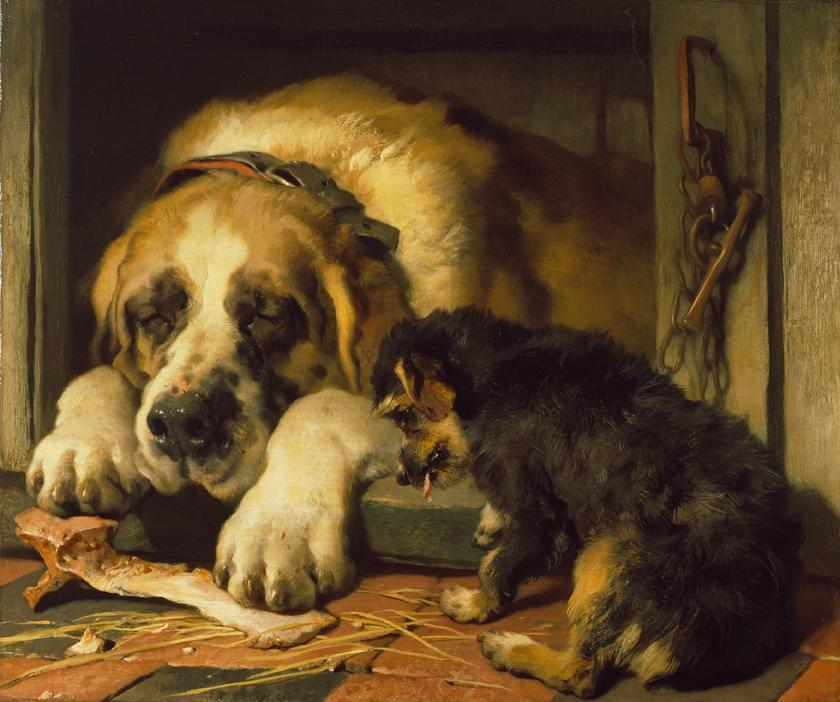
Doubtful Crumbs (1858–1859) by Edwin Landseer

Doubtful Crumbs is an 1858–1859 oil on canvas painting of a St. Bernard or mastiff and a street dog, by the English artist Edwin Landseer, now in the Wallace Collection, in London. Until at least 1902 it was also known as Looking for the Crumbs that Fall from the Rich Man's Table, referring to Luke 16.19-21.

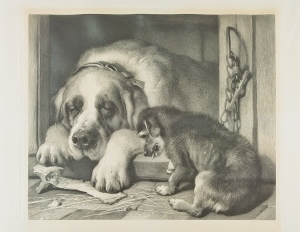
Edwin Henry Landseer after Thomas Landseer (1795–1880): Mixed-technique engraving, 1862, 74 × 81,7 cm. Metropolitan Museum of Art, New York

The work was engraved by the artist's brother Thomas - Edwin relied on private buyers and income from prints of his works. The painting was first exhibited in 1859 at the Royal Academy, of which Landseer had been a Fellow since 1831, where it was bought by the businessman and patron Elhanan Bicknell (1788–1861). It was then bought as Lot 105 at a posthumous auction of Bicknell's collection on 25 April 1863 by Richard Seymour-Conway, 4th Marquess of Hertford It was later offered for sale for £3138 but declined and so remained in what became the Wallace Collection.

== Bibliography ==
- Charles Clarke: Crumbs from a Sportsman's Table. Chapman & Hall, 1869; S. 336–338
- Littell's The Living Age, plate 74, Living Age Company Incorporated, Boston 1862; S. 417
