= Charles Dickens in His Study =

Painting by William Powell Frith

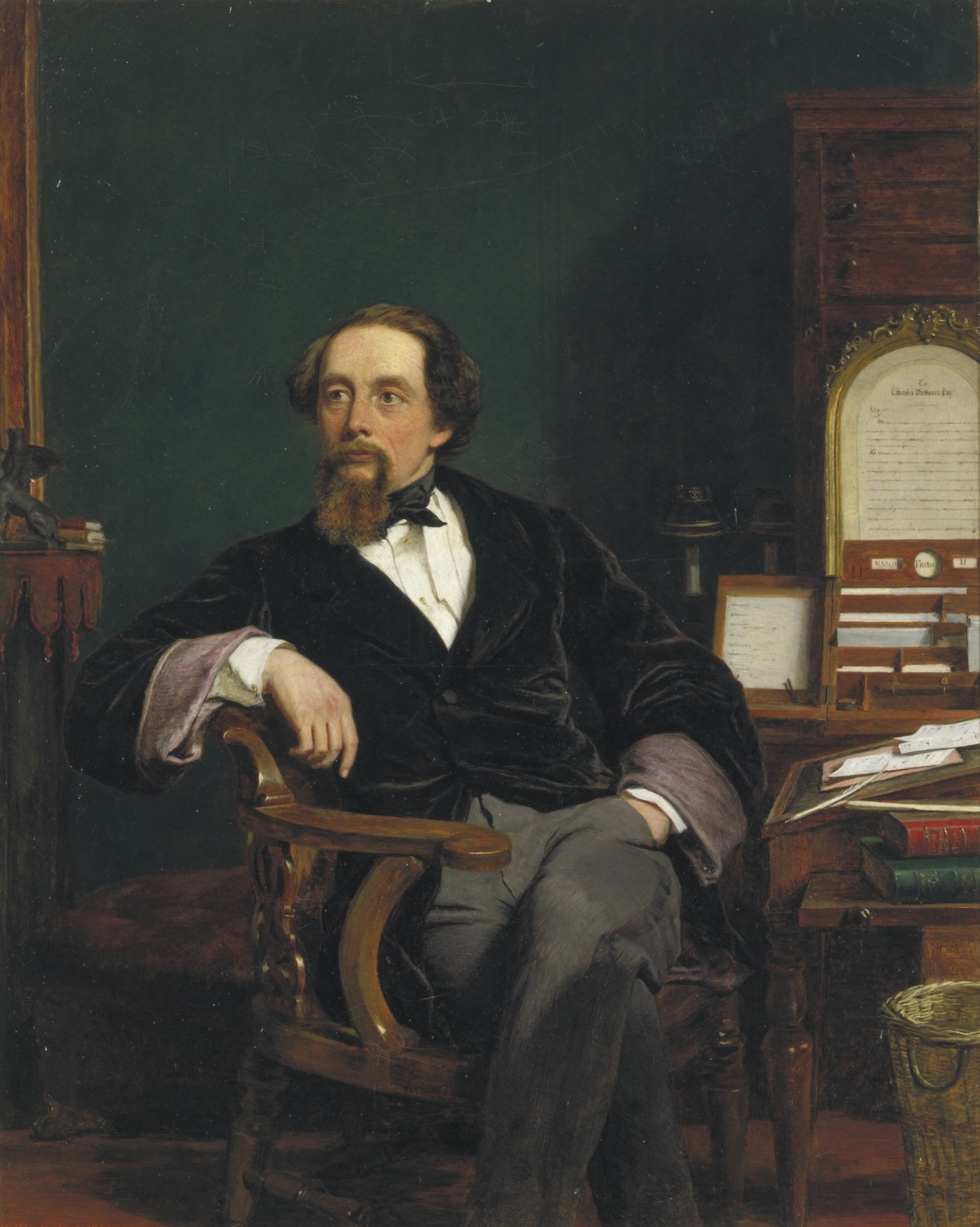
- Artist: William Powell Frith
- Year: 1859
- Medium: Oil on canvas
- Dimensions: 98 cm × 84 cm (39 in × 33 in)
- Location: Victoria and Albert Museum, London

Charles Dickens in His Study is an oil on canvas painting by English artist William Powell Frith, created in 1859. The painting is signed and dated at the lower left, 'W P Frith fecit 1859'. It is held at the Victoria and Albert Museum, in London.

== History and description ==
It was John Forster, a friend and biographer of English writer Charles Dickens, who commissioned the current portrait from Frith at the height of Dickens' fame. Frith was also a great admirer of Dickens and often took inspiration from his work in his genre paintings. Forster had a similar photograph of Dickens to be taken before the painting, but Frith decided to ignore it and didn't use it. Frith seems to have struggled to finish the portrait. In a letter of the same year, he wrote about his "portrait of Charles Dickens whose troublesome face I shall remember to the day of my death". Forster appreciated the final result, unlike Dickens, because he didn't like the way his expression was depicted in it. Dickens stated that "it is a little too much (to my thinking) as if my next door neighbour were my deadly foe, uninsured, and I had just received tidings of his house being a-fire."

The portrait depicts Dickens seated in his house study, in Bloomsbury, looking to his left, while not facing directly the viewer, with legs crossed. He has one hand on his pocket and the other arm on the chair. In his secretary, to the right, some pages of the first chapter of A Tale of Two Cities, the novel he was then working on, can be seen, as well as two volumes. At the bottom right appears a wicker basket.

== See also ==
- Portrait of Charles Dickens, an 1839 painting by Daniel Maclise
