= List of ambassadors of the United States to Hungary =

Ambassador of the United States to Hungary
- Seal of the United States Department of State

- Flag of a United States ambassador

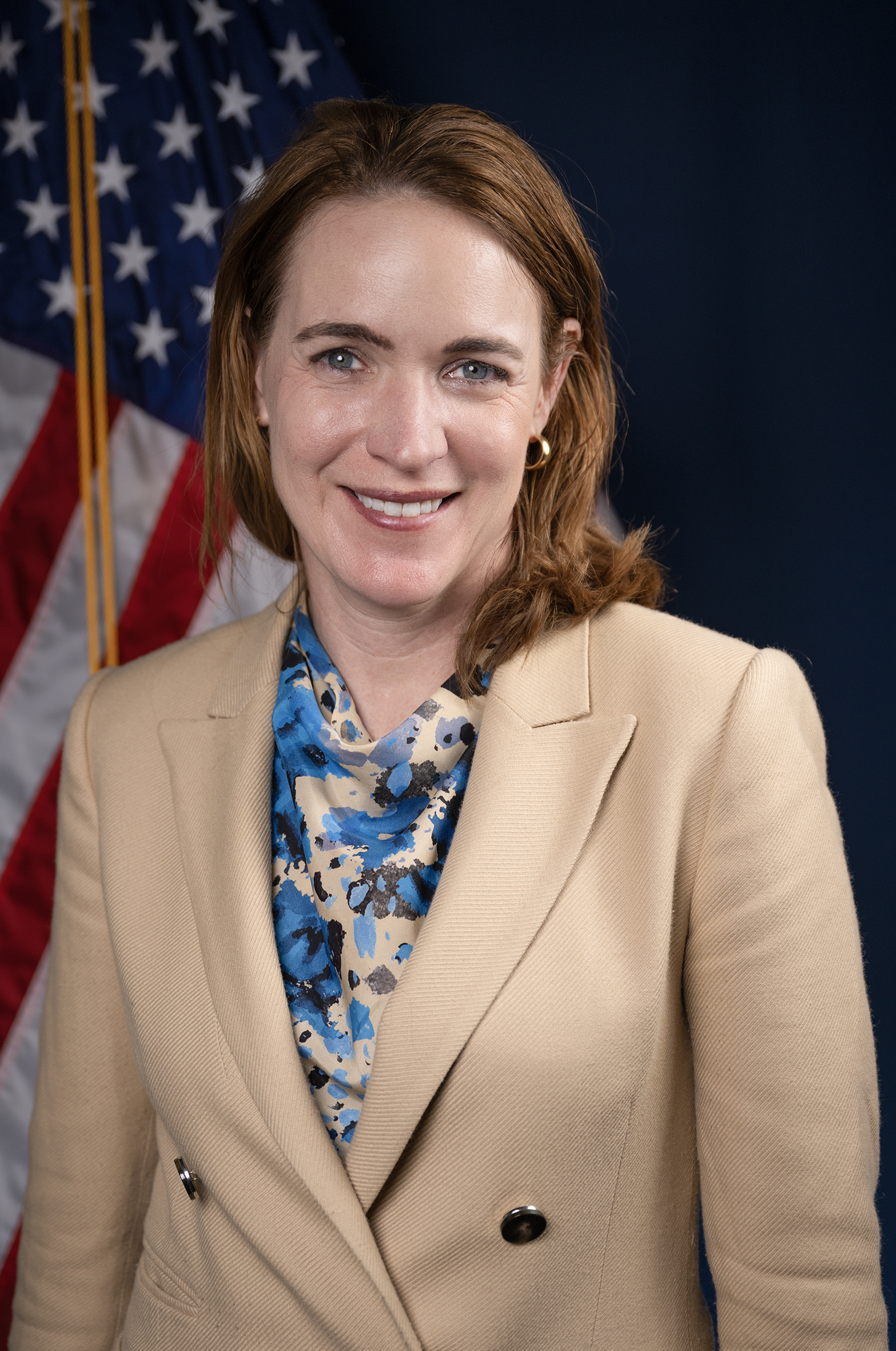
- Incumbent; Caroline Savage; Chargé d'affaires since November 21, 2025
- Residence: Szabadság Square 12, Budapest, H-1054
- Nominator: The president of the United States
- Appointer: The president; with Senate advice and consent
- Inaugural holder: Ulysses Grant-Smith as Chargé d'Affaires pro tem
- Formation: December 26, 1921
- Website: U.S. Embassy - Budapest

This is a list of ambassadors of the United States to Hungary.

Until 1867 Hungary had been part of the Austrian Empire, when the empire became Austria-Hungary. Hungary had no separate diplomatic relations with other nations. The United States had diplomatic relations with the empire and Austria-Hungary through the legation in Vienna.

The empire was dissolved following World War I, and the United States established separate diplomatic relations with Austria and Hungary in 1921, reopening the embassy in Vienna and establishing a legation in Budapest. Ulysses Grant-Smith opened the U.S. legation on December 26, 1921, and remained the chief of mission as chargé d'affaires until an ambassador was commissioned the following year.

For ambassadors to Austria-Hungary prior to the dissolution of the empire, see the list of ambassadors of the United States to Austria.

The United States Embassy in Hungary is located on Szabadság tér (Liberty Square) in the Pest part of Budapest.

== Ambassadors ==
Name	Title	Appointed	Presented credentials	Terminated mission	Notes
Ulysses Grant-Smith (Note: Grant-Smith was not commissioned. His letter of credence was dated December 27, 1921. He had opened the legation on December 26 and had been granted provisional recognition as Chargé d’Affaires.) – Career FSO	Chargé d'Affaires pro tem	Not commissioned	January 24, 1922	April 28, 1922	
Theodore Brentano – Political appointee	Envoy Extraordinary and Minister Plenipotentiary	February 10, 1922	May 16, 1922	Presented recall, May 6, 1927	
J. Butler Wright – Career FSO	Envoy Extraordinary and Minister Plenipotentiary	February 26, 1927	June 18, 1927	Presented recall, October 24, 1930	
Nicholas Roosevelt (Note: Roosevelt was commissioned during a recess of the Senate and recommissioned after confirmation on December 16, 1930.) – Political appointee	Envoy Extraordinary and Minister Plenipotentiary	September 29, 1930	November 12, 1930	May 9, 1933	
John Flournoy Montgomery – Political appointee	Envoy Extraordinary and Minister Plenipotentiary	June 13, 1933	August 1, 1933	March 17, 1941	
Herbert Claiborne Pell – Political appointee	Envoy Extraordinary and Minister Plenipotentiary	February 11, 1941	May 20, 1941	January 16, 1942	
Hungary severed diplomatic relations with the United States on December 11, 1941, the day the United States declared war on Germany. Hungary declared war on the United States two days later. Pell closed the legation and departed Hungary on January 16, 1942. The United States and Hungary established normal diplomatic relations again after the war ended in 1945.
H.F. Arthur Schoenfeld – Career FSO	Envoy Extraordinary and Minister Plenipotentiary	December 15, 1945	January 26, 1946	June 1, 1947	
Selden Chapin (Note: Chapin was declared persona non grata by the government of Hungary on February 11, 1949, and departed Hungary on February 17. The government of Hungary had accused Chapin of conspiring with Cardinal József Mindszenty.) – Career FSO	Envoy Extraordinary and Minister Plenipotentiary	April 10, 1947	July 9, 1947	February 17, 1949	
Nathaniel P. Davis – Career FSO	Envoy Extraordinary and Minister Plenipotentiary	September 1, 1949	October 21, 1949	May 18, 1951	
Christian M. Ravndal – Career FSO	Envoy Extraordinary and Minister Plenipotentiary	October 3, 1951	January 11, 1952	August 5, 1956	
Edward T. Wailes – Career FSO	Envoy Extraordinary and Minister Plenipotentiary	July 26, 1956	Did not present credentials	left post, February 27, 1957	Ambassador Wailes had been commissioned as ambassador during the Imre Nagy regime in Hungary, prior to the Hungarian Revolution of 1956. He arrived in Hungary on November 2, 1956, shortly after the new János Kádár government had been installed. Wailes refused to present his credentials to the new government, stating that the government "did not represent the people." Shortly thereafter he was "recalled for consultations" and he left Hungary on February 27, 1957.
Garret G. Ackerson Jr.	Chargé d'Affaires ad interim	July 1957	Unknown	February 1961	
Horace G. Torbert Jr.	Chargé d'Affaires ad interim	February 1961	Unknown	December 1962	
Owen T. Jones	Chargé d'Affaires ad interim	December 1962	Unknown	July 1964	
Elim O'Shaughnessy	Chargé d'Affaires ad interim	November 1964	Unknown	September 1966	
Richard W. Tims	Chargé d'Affaires ad interim	September 1966	Unknown	October 1967	
Martin J. Hillenbrand – Career FSO	Ambassador Extraordinary and Plenipotentiary	September 13, 1967	October 30, 1967	February 15, 1969	Legation upgraded to embassy; title upgraded to "Ambassador Extraordinary and Plenipotentiary".
Alfred Puhan – Career FSO	Ambassador Extraordinary and Plenipotentiary	May 1, 1969	June 16, 1969	July 9, 1973	
Richard F. Pedersen – Career FSO	Ambassador Extraordinary and Plenipotentiary	July 24, 1973	September 10, 1973	March 26, 1975	
Eugene V. McAuliffe – Career FSO	Ambassador Extraordinary and Plenipotentiary	March 25, 1975	April 28, 1975	April 15, 1976	
Philip M. Kaiser – Political appointee	Ambassador Extraordinary and Plenipotentiary	July 7, 1977	August 4, 1977	March 9, 1980	
Harry E. Bergold Jr. – Political appointee	Ambassador Extraordinary and Plenipotentiary	March 3, 1980	March 31, 1980	November 9, 1983	
Nicolas M. Salgo – Political appointee	Ambassador Extraordinary and Plenipotentiary	October 7, 1983	November 23, 1983	August 1, 1986	
Robie Marcus Hooker Palmer – Career FSO	Ambassador Extraordinary and Plenipotentiary	July 24, 1986	December 8, 1986	January 31, 1990	
Charles H. Thomas – Career FSO	Ambassador Extraordinary and Plenipotentiary	June 27, 1990	July 2, 1990	January 11, 1994	
Donald M. Blinken – Political appointee	Ambassador Extraordinary and Plenipotentiary	March 28, 1994	April 1, 1994	November 20, 1997	
Peter Francis Tufo – Political appointee	Ambassador Extraordinary and Plenipotentiary	November 10, 1997	December 3, 1997	March 1, 2001	
Nancy Goodman Brinker – Political appointee	Ambassador Extraordinary and Plenipotentiary	August 7, 2001	September 26, 2001	June 19, 2003	
George H. Walker III – Political appointee	Ambassador Extraordinary and Plenipotentiary	August 4, 2003	October 6, 2003	August 6, 2006	
April H. Foley – Political appointee	Ambassador Extraordinary and Plenipotentiary	May 30, 2006	August 18, 2006	April 2, 2009	
Eleni Tsakopoulos Kounalakis – Political appointee	Ambassador Extraordinary and Plenipotentiary	January 7, 2010	January 11, 2010	July 20, 2013	
M. André Goodfriend	Chargé d’Affaires ad interim	August 18, 2013	n/a	January 20, 2015	
Colleen Bradley Bell – Political appointee	Ambassador Extraordinary and Plenipotentiary	December 14, 2014	January 21, 2015	January 20, 2017	
David Kostelancik	Chargé d’Affaires ad interim	January 20, 2017	n/a	June 22, 2018	
David B. Cornstein – Political appointee	Ambassador Extraordinary and Plenipotentiary	February 13, 2018	June 22, 2018	October 30, 2020	
Marc Dillard	Chargé d’Affaires ad interim	October 30, 2020	n/a	August 10, 2022	
B. Bix Aliu	Chargé d'Affaires ad interim	August 10, 2022	n/a	September 14, 2022	Served as Chargé d'Affaires until the arrival of the appointed Ambassador, David Pressman.
David Pressman – Political appointee	Ambassador Extraordinary and Plenipotentiary	August 8, 2022	September 14, 2022	January 13, 2025	
David Holmes	Chargé d'Affaires ad interim	January 13, 2025	n/a	March 7, 2025	
Robert Palladino	Chargé d'Affaires ad interim	March 7, 2025	n/a	November 20, 2025	
Caroline Savage	Chargé d'Affaires ad interim	November 21, 2025	n/a	Incumbent	

== See also ==
- Ambassadors to Hungary — Photographs of U.S. Ambassadors to Hungary 1941–2001 (PDF)
- Hungary – United States relations
- Foreign relations of Hungary
- Ambassadors of the United States
