= George Sharpe =

George Sharpe or Sharp may refer to:

== Sharpe ==
- George H. Sharpe (1828–1900), lawyer, American Civil War general, politician
- George Sharpe (footballer) (1912–1984), English footballer
- George Sharpe (politician) (1908–1985), Canadian politician

== Sharp ==
- George G. Sharp, a marine design and naval architecture firm
- George Sharp (cricketer) (born 1950), English cricketer and umpire
- George Sharp (footballer) (born 1935), English footballer
- George B. Sharp, Irish-American silversmith,
- G. Kendall Sharp (1934–2022), United States district judge
- George Sharp, illustrator of e.g., of James Clavell's children' book Thrump-O-Moto (1986)
