= David B. Cornstein =

American businessman and diplomat (1938–2026)

David Cornstein
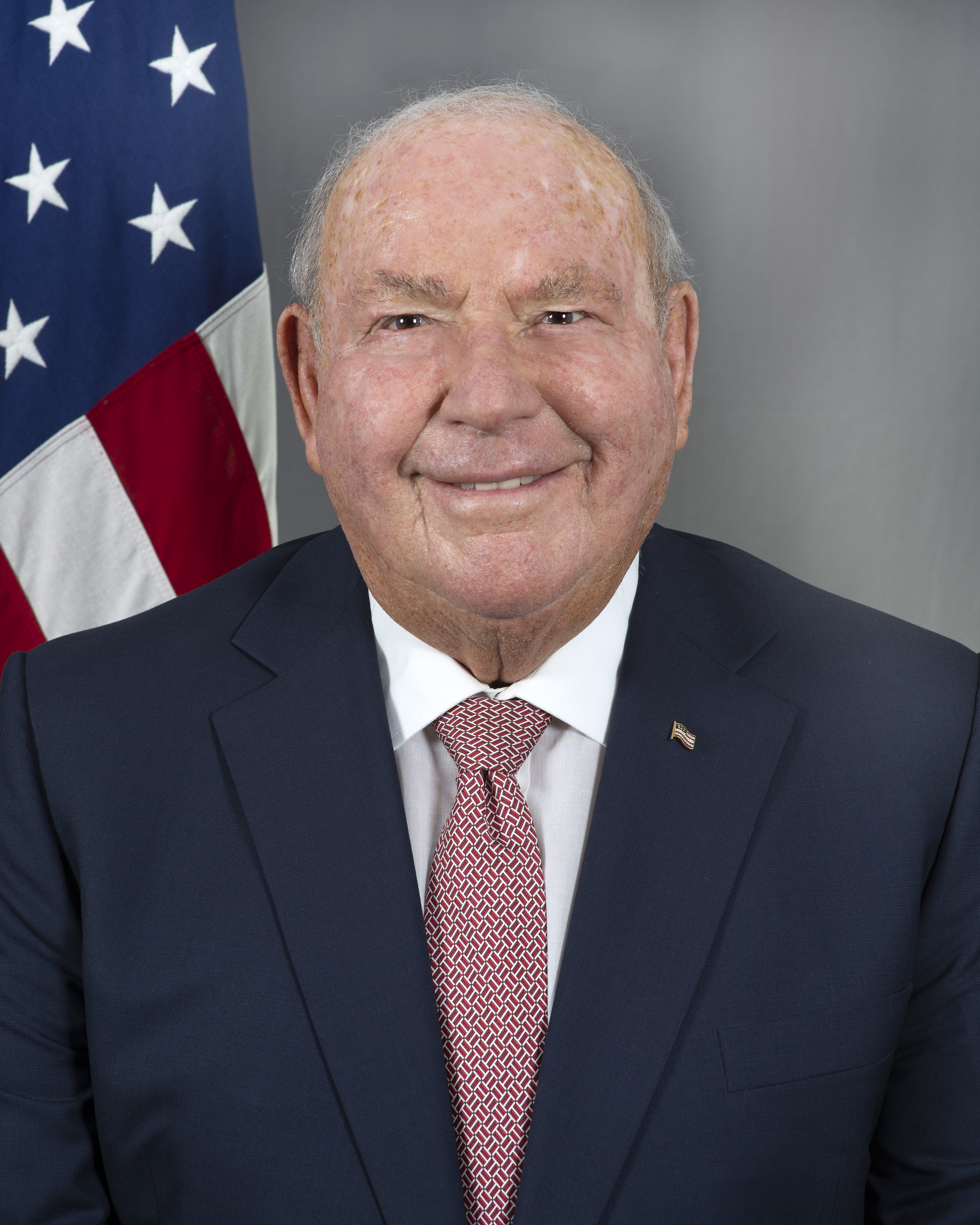

United States Ambassador to Hungary
- In office June 22, 2018 – October 30, 2020
- President: Donald Trump
- Preceded by: Colleen Bell
- Succeeded by: Marc Dillard, Chargé d'Affaires

Personal details
- Born: David Bert Cornstein; August 17, 1938 New York City, U.S.
- Died: March 26, 2026 (aged 87) Palm Beach, Florida, U.S.
- Party: Republican
- Children: 1
- Education: Lafayette College (BA); New York University (MBA)
- Occupation: Businessman; diplomat

David Bert Cornstein (August 17, 1938 – March 26, 2026) was an American businessman and diplomat who was the United States Ambassador to Hungary between 2018 and 2020. Cornstein made a career in the gambling, jewelry, and telemarketing industries. Cornstein was nominated to the ambassadorship by President Donald Trump. As Ambassador, Cornstein vocally defended the government of Viktor Orbán.

== Early life and education ==
Cornstein was born in New York City on August 17, 1938, into a Jewish family. As the only child of Irwin, who worked in the rug business, and Fanny, a schoolteacher, Cornstein grew up in the city. His maternal grandparents immigrated to the U.S. from Hungary. Cornstein attended P.S. 168 in The Bronx and later attended Horace Mann School, graduating in 1956. He earned a B.A. in 1960 from Lafayette College in Easton, Pennsylvania, where as an alumnus he became a member of the Marquis Society of donors to the college. He subsequently earned an M.B.A. from New York University (NYU). Cornstein then served as a cook in the Army Reserve.

== Career ==
Cornstein started his career while studying at NYU. He opened a jewelry counter in a J. C. Penney store on Long Island and later expanded the operations into a company called Tru-Run, selling jewelry in department stores throughout the United States. Cornstein served as the president, chief executive officer, and a director. The company bought a similar firm, Seligman and Latz, in 1985 and Finlay Fine Jewelry for $217 million in 1988. Cornstein formed a new holding company, Finlay Enterprises, where he became president and chief executive in December 1988 and continued as a director of Finlay Fine Jewelry. The company continued to grow through the economic downturn in 1989, and in the 1990s expanded into Europe. In January 1999, Cornstein left Finlay as acting chief executive.

He was appointed to the New York Off-Track Betting Commission in 1994 and eventually became its chairman. He promoted ideas like televising races live and an 800 telephone number for gamblers to wager.

Cornstein contemplated runs for Mayor of New York City in 1985 and 1991. He briefly declared himself a candidate for New York State Comptroller in 2001. Cornstein later dropped out of the race after Republicans leaders backed the eventual candidate, John Faso.

In September 1999, he was named chairman of TeleHubLink, a telemarketing company that produced wireless encryption products. He had previously been a director of What A World! since July 1993, before it changed its name to TeleHub. His connection with TeleHubLink proved problematic when, in April 2001, Eliot Spitzer filed a lawsuit against TeleHubLink for violating consumer protection laws. The State argued:

Using the name Triple Gold Benefits, Telehublink Inc.'s telemarketers promised thousands of consumers across the nation that, for an advance fee of over $200, the consumers would receive a low rate, general purpose Visa or MasterCard credit card. In fact, consumers who paid the advance fee did not receive a credit card. Instead, Telehublink sent them a "discount benefits package" consisting of generally worthless items such as an application for a credit card.

In January 2003, the Third Department of the New York State Supreme Court, Appellate Division, upheld a 2001 ruling that "had halted the scam and awarded restitution to victimized consumers". Cornstein was previously the chairman of Pinnacle Advisors Ltd., in addition to being CEO, president, and chairman emeritus of Finlay Enterprises. In 2006, Cornstein was elected chairman of the board of the Jewelers' Security Alliance. New York Governor George Pataki gave Cornstein the chairmanship of the New York State Olympic Games Commission as it prepared a bid for the 2012 games, which eventually went to London.

=== U.S. Ambassador to Hungary ===
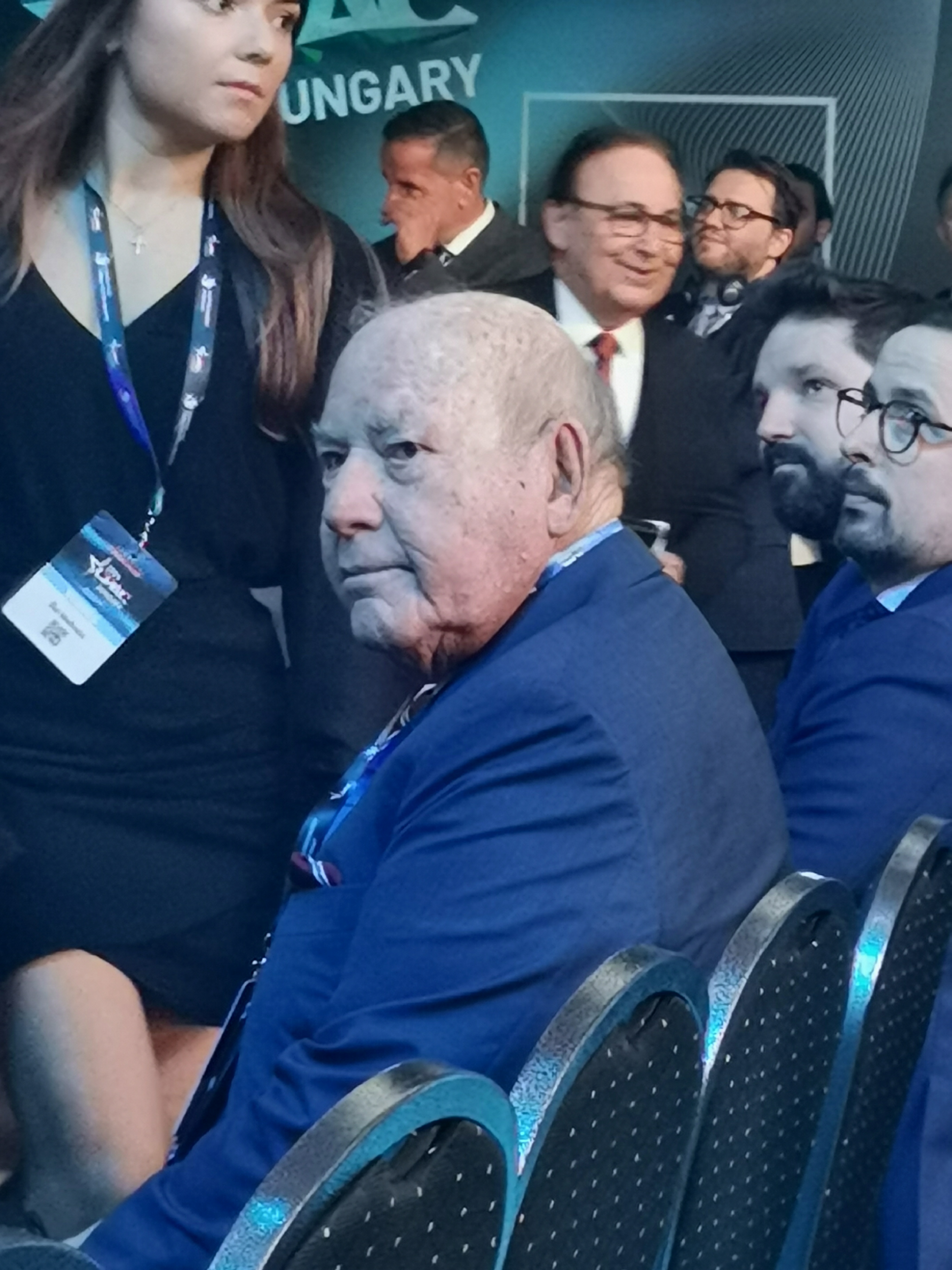
Cornstein at CPAC Hungary 2024

A life-long Republican, Cornstein was a frequent contributor to Republican politicians, although he also donated to the campaigns of Democrats Chuck Schumer and Cory Booker.

On February 13, 2018, United States President Donald Trump nominated Cornstein to be U.S. Ambassador to Hungary. Cornstein was a long-time friend of Trump's. He was a member of Trump's golf club in West Palm Beach.

As Ambassador, Cornstein vocally defended the government of Viktor Orbán. According to The Washington Post, Cornstein sought to "charm" rather than shame Orbán. According to some critics, under Orbán's premiership, Hungary underwent and is continuing to undergo democratic backsliding, becoming increasingly authoritarian. Cornstein told Hungarian media that he had seen no evidence of this authoritarian shift, but according to reports of "mounting evidence" the government has infringed on human rights in Hungary. The Hungarian government and its defenders gleefully repeated Cornstein's remarks. In a 2019 interview with The Atlantic's Franklin Foer, Cornstein was asked about Orbán's own description of his administration as an "illiberal democracy", Cornstein said, "I can tell you, knowing [Trump] for a good 25 or 30 years, that he would love to have the situation that Viktor Orbán has, but he doesn't."

In September 2018, Cornstein claimed that he had reached an agreement with Orbán that Central European University, a notable American university in Budapest, would be allowed to stay in Hungary. However, in December 2018, Central European University alleged it had been kicked out of Hungary in what The Washington Post described as "a dark waypoint in Hungary's crackdown on civil society and an ominous sign for U.S. institutions operating under autocratic regimes worldwide". During the same week that Central European University chose to leave Hungary, Cornstein described Orbán as a "friend" and criticized George Soros, who founded the university. Cornstein stated that Soros had a crazed hatred of Orbán, which led CEU not to make concessions to stay in Hungary. Cornstein mocked the size of Central European University, said that the departure of CEU "doesn't have anything to do with academic freedom", and mused why "this has become such an important subject in the world". Asked by The Atlantic's Franklin Foer if US relations with Hungary would suffer as a result of the CEU ouster, Cornstein answered "not really." When Cornstein gave his answer, his aide asked him to step out of the room; Cornstein told Foer, "I'm in trouble."

In October 2019, The New York Times published a story documenting controversies during Cornstein's tenure as U.S. Ambassador to Hungary, highlighting his close support of Orbán's policies and unchecked power, as well as extravagant spending on parties.

On September 15, 2020, the U.S. Embassy in Budapest announced that Cornstein informed President Trump and Hungarian Foreign Minister Péter Szijjártó that he would end his service as U.S. Ambassador to Hungary effective November 1, 2020. In doing so, the ambassador said that “it has been an honor and a privilege to serve the country that I love in a country that I have come to cherish".

== Personal life and death ==
Cornstein was married to his wife, Sheila, for over 50 years. He was active in Jewish organizations and the Jewish community. Cornstein has one son.

Cornstein died in Palm Beach, Florida on March 26, 2026, at the age of 87.

Diplomatic posts
Preceded by Colleen Bell	United States Ambassador to Hungary; 2018–2020	Succeeded by Marc Dillard; Chargé d'Affaires
