= Nicolas M. Salgo =

American diplomat (1914–2005)

United States Ambassador to Hungary
- In office November 23, 1983 – August 1, 1986
- President: Ronald Reagan
- Preceded by: Harry E. Bergold Jr.
- Succeeded by: Mark Palmer

Personal details
- Born: August 17, 1914 Budapest, Hungary
- Died: February 26, 2005 (aged 90)
- Profession: Politician

Nicolas M. Salgo (August 17, 1914 – February 26, 2005) was an American diplomat. A non-career appointee, he served as the U.S. Ambassador Extraordinary and Plenipotentiary to Hungary from 1983 until 1986. His nomination, in 1992, to be Ambassador to Sweden, was not acted upon by the Senate.

== Biography ==
Salgo was born in Budapest, Hungary on August 17, 1914. He received his LLD and PhD in 1937 from Eötvös Loránd University in Budapest. Salgo became a US citizen in 1953. Among various professional endeavors, he was founder and limited ownership partner of the Watergate complex. He was a consultant for Central and Eastern Europe to the United States Information Agency from 1982 to 1983. He was named to Ronald Reagan’s International Private Enterprise Task Force. When he returned to the US after serving as ambassador, he continued working with the State Department on "bilateral property projects involving Eastern European nations". By 1989, President George H. W. Bush appointed him Special Negotiator for Property Issues, with the permanent rank of Ambassador. While in Hungary, he became an avid art collector.

The Nicolas M. Salgo endowed Chair in Business has been established in his name at the University of Maine.
