= Mark Palmer (diplomat) =

United States diplomat (1941–2013)

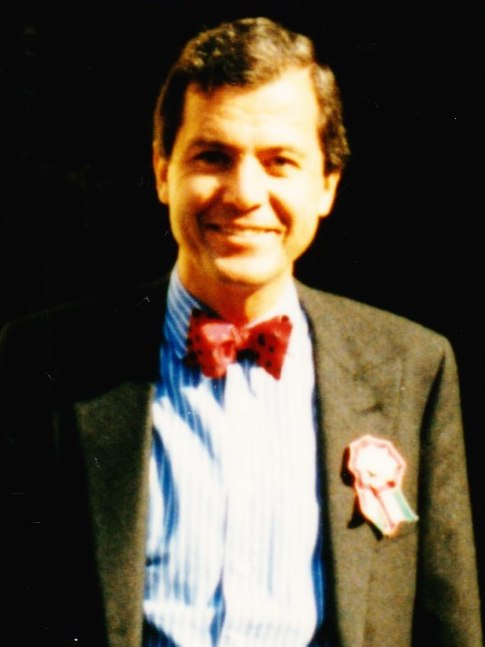
- Mark Palmer, US Ambassador to Hungary on October 23, 1989

United States Ambassador to Hungary
- In office December 8, 1986 – January 31, 1990
- President: Ronald Reagan; George H. W. Bush
- Preceded by: Nicolas M. Salgo
- Succeeded by: Charles H. Thomas

Personal details
- Born: Robie Marcus Hooker Palmer; July 14, 1941 Ann Arbor, Michigan, U.S.
- Died: January 28, 2013 (aged 71) Washington D.C.
- Spouse: Dr. Sushma Mahyera Palmer
- Parents: Captain Robie E. Palmer (father); Katherine Hooker Palmer (mother)
- Education: Yale University

Robie Marcus Hooker Palmer (July 14, 1941 – January 28, 2013) was an American diplomat, who served as United States Ambassador to Hungary from 1986 to 1990. He was a member of the American Academy of Diplomacy and the Committee on the Present Danger, Vice Chairman of Freedom House and the Council for a Community of Democracies. He was also the co-founder of the National Endowment for Democracy.

He established in 2000 the association The Friends of Falun Gong.

== Education ==
Palmer was born in Ann Arbor, Michigan, and graduated from Vermont Academy in 1959. He received a B.A. from Yale University in 1963. Palmer entered the foreign service in 1964.

== Policy positions ==
Palmer served in policy positions for the United States State Department in the Nixon, Ford, Carter, Reagan, and George H. W. Bush administrations, including launching the National Endowment for Democracy. From the outside, he has worked with both the Clinton and George W. Bush Administrations, helping persuade them to initiate new democracy policies, including the Community of Democracies and abolishing the so-called "Arab exception", for the first time promoting democracy in the Arab world.

== Dictatorships ==
Palmer was possessed of practical experience inside dictatorships, working directly with dictators, and helping to oust them without a shot being fired. He lived for 11 years in the Soviet Union, Yugoslavia, and Hungary under the communists as a student and diplomat. He organized and participated in the first Reagan-Gorbachev summit as the State Department's top "Kremlinologist", and as the U.S. Ambassador to Hungary helped persuade its last dictator to leave power. He was active on China and the Middle East, for example, as the founding board member of an organization to support the largest movement for change in China, and working to support the emergence of politically independent commercial television stations throughout the Arab world.

== Civil rights ==
From his days in the U.S. Civil Rights Movement as a member of the Student Nonviolent Coordinating Committee (SNCC), through demonstrating in the streets of Budapest as ambassador, to marching with the students in Belgrade against Slobodan Milosevic in 1996, Palmer witnessed and practiced the power of organized nonviolent force in achieving freedom and justice.

== Business experience ==
Palmer became a venture capitalist and investor in 1990, and president of his own company. He believed in the potential of business as a force in the transition to democracy. He co-founded Central European Media Enterprises, which financed and launched the first national independent television stations in the Czech Republic, Slovakia, Slovenia, Romania, and Ukraine with more than $600 million in investment.

== Speeches ==
A recognized writer and advocate, Palmer wrote speeches for six Secretaries of State and three Presidents, and was principal speechwriter for Henry Kissinger and co-author of Ronald Reagan's favorite speech ("played a leading role in drafting President Reagan's historic Westminster Address to the British Parliament"),. As Vice Chairman of the Board of Freedom House, he was a frequent contributor to published appeals and policy statements, and participant in democracy programs in the United States and across the arc of dictatorships stretching from China, through the Middle East and Africa, on to Belarus and Cuba.

== Books ==
Palmer's 2003 book, Breaking the Real Axis of Evil: How to Oust the World's Last Dictators by 2025, argued for a revamping of American foreign policy to make the worldwide promotion of democracy its foremost goal.

Diplomatic posts
Preceded by Nicolas M. Salgo	United States Ambassador to Hungary; 1986–1990	Succeeded by Charles H. Thomas
