= Richard F. Pedersen =

American diplomat (1925–2011)

President of the American University in Cairo
- In office January 20, 1977 – January 20, 1990
- Preceded by: Cecil K. Byrd
- Succeeded by: Donald McDonald

United States Ambassador to Hungary
- In office July 24, 1973 – March 26, 1975
- President: Richard M. Nixon; Gerald Ford
- Preceded by: Alfred Puhan
- Succeeded by: Eugene V. McAuliffe

16th Counselor of the United States Department of State
- In office January 24, 1969 – July 26, 1973
- President: Richard M. Nixon
- Preceded by: Robert R. Bowie
- Succeeded by: Helmut Sonnenfeldt

Personal details
- Born: Richard F. Pedersen; February 21, 1925 Miami, Arizona, U.S.
- Died: July 11, 2011 (aged 86) Greenport, New York, U.S.
- Education: College of the Pacific (BA); Stanford University (MA); Harvard University (PhD)
- Profession: Diplomat

Military service
- Branch/service: 44th Infantry

Richard Foote Pedersen (February 21, 1925 – July 11, 2011) was an American diplomat who was a career Foreign Service Officer in the United States State Department and President of the American University in Cairo.

== Early life ==
Pedersen was born in Miami, Arizona and served with the 44th Infantry in the European Theater of Operations during World War II. After the war, he earned a bachelor's degree in international relations from the College of the Pacific (now University of the Pacific), followed by a master's degree from Stanford University and a doctorate from Harvard University.

== Diplomatic career ==
From 1953 to 1969, Pedersen served in the United States Mission to the United Nations to the United Nations alongside Charles W. Yost. He served at the U.N. under five ambassadors, including Henry Cabot Lodge Jr. and Adlai Stevenson. From January 23, 1969 until July 26, 1973, Pedersen served as Counselor of the United States Department of State, during the Nixon Administration. In 1970, his phones were bugged by the Nixon White House, as part of an effort to investigate leaks about the Invasion of Cambodia.

=== United States Ambassador to Hungary ===
On July 24, 1973, Pedersen was appointed United States Ambassador to Hungary, and he presented his credentials on September 10, 1973. He left the post on March 26, 1975.

== American University of Cairo ==
From 1977 until 1990, Pedersen served as the President of the American University of Cairo, and led efforts to have the University receive full higher education accreditation. During his tenure the university expanded.

== Later years and death ==
Pederson died in Greenport, New York on July 11, 2011, at the age of 86.

Diplomatic posts
Preceded by Alfred Puhan	United States Ambassador to Hungary; 1973–1975	Succeeded by Eugene V. McAuliffe
Preceded by Cecil K. Byrd	President of The American University in Cairo; 1977-1990	Succeeded by Donald McDonald
