= Herbert Pell =

American politician (1884–1961)

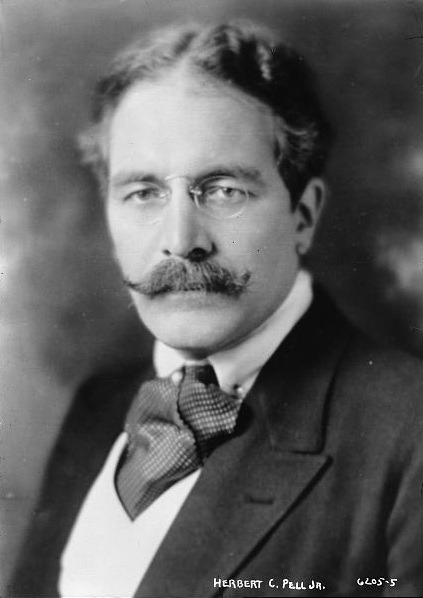

United States Ambassador to Hungary
- In office February 11, 1941 – November 30, 1942
- President: Franklin D. Roosevelt
- Preceded by: John Flournoy Montgomery
- Succeeded by: None

United States Ambassador to Portugal
- In office May 27, 1937 – February 11, 1941
- President: Franklin D. Roosevelt
- Preceded by: Robert Granville Caldwell
- Succeeded by: Bert Fish

Member of the U.S. House of Representatives from New York's 17th district
- In office March 4, 1919 – March 3, 1921
- Preceded by: John F. Carew
- Succeeded by: Ogden L. Mills

Personal details
- Born: Herbert Claiborne Pell Jr. February 16, 1884 New York City, U.S.
- Died: July 17, 1961 (aged 77) Munich, West Germany
- Resting place: Atlantic Ocean at Beavertail in Jamestown, Rhode Island
- Party: Democratic
- Other political affiliations: Progressive (1912–1918)
- Spouses: Matilda Bigelow (m. 1915; div. 1927) Olive Bigelow Tilton (m. 1927)
- Children: Claiborne Pell
- Education: Pomfret School
- Alma mater: Harvard University; Columbia University; New York University

Herbert Claiborne Pell Jr. (February 16, 1884 – July 17, 1961) was a United States representative from New York, U.S. Minister to Portugal, U.S. Minister to Hungary, and a creator and member of the United Nations War Crimes Commission.

A native of New York City and a member of the prominent and wealthy Lorillard and Claiborne families, Pell was educated at Connecticut's Pomfret School and attended Harvard University, Columbia University, and New York University. Originally active in politics as a Progressive, he later became a Democrat. In 1918, Pell was elected to Congress, and he served from 1919 to 1921. He was an unsuccessful candidate for reelection in 1920. Pell continued to remain active in politics, and was chairman of the New York State Democratic Committee from 1921 to 1926 and a delegate to the 1924 Democratic National Convention. He served as vice chairman of the Democratic National Campaign Committee for the 1936 elections.

In 1937, Pell was appointed as Minister to Portugal, where he served from May 27, 1937, until February 11, 1941, when he was appointed Minister to Hungary. In December 1941, Pell received Hungary's declaration of war against the United States, closed the embassy and returned to the United States. He formally resigned in November 1942. From 1942 to 1945, Pell was the United States representative on the United Nations War Crimes Commission. Pell was recognized as an internationalist on foreign policy and a progressive despite coming from the wealthy and conservative class, which tended to be isolationist. He was the leading American seeking to build awareness of the plight of European Jews in the 1930s and 1940s and prevent the Holocaust, and was able to aid in holding the perpetrators responsible as the principal U.S. sponsor of and U.S. representative of the War Crimes Commission.

Pell died in Munich, West Germany on July 17, 1961. His remains were cremated and scattered in the Atlantic Ocean at Beavertail in Jamestown, Rhode Island.

== Early life ==
Pell was born in New York City on February 16, 1884. He was the elder son of two children born to Katherine Lorillard (née Kernochan) Pell (1858–1917) and Herbert Claiborne Pell (1853–1926). His younger brother was Clarence Cecil Pell (1885–1964). He was a great-grandson of U.S. Representative John Francis Hamtramck Claiborne, and great-great-grandnephew of William Charles Cole Claiborne and Nathaniel Herbert Claiborne. Through his mother and maternal grandparents, James Powell Kernochan and Catherine (née Lorillard) Kernochan, the daughter of Pierre Lorillard III, he inherited a share of the Lorillard Tobacco fortune. He was also a direct descendant of Wampage I, a Siwanoy chieftain, as reflected in a Congressional Record entry relating to his son Claiborne Pell.

Pell was educated at the Pomfret School, in Connecticut. He attended Harvard University, Columbia University, and New York University, but did not complete a degree. At Harvard, Pell became friends with one of his classmates, the future president Franklin D. Roosevelt, which was to later on benefit his diplomatic career as Roosevelt distrusted the professional diplomats of the State Department and much preferred to appoint his friends as diplomats. Pell was one of the few people allowed to address Roosevelt as "Frank", a term that normally offended him. Pell first met Roosevelt in 1902 during the fall semester as freshmen at Harvard and he remained in close contact with until January 1945 when Roosevelt abruptly terminated their friendship. Pell was generally known to his friends as "Bertie" and he was rarely referred to as Herbert.

Pell later wrote that there were three types of students at Harvard, namely the "drunks" who were primarily interested in drinking/partying and only studied to avoid being expelled for their low grades; the careerists who studied only for high grades that might help their future careers; and the students such as himself who studied for "learning's sake". He wrote that of the 800 or so new students who entered Harvard in September 1902, "there were not forty that had any idea of doing anything with their lives". Pell was an outspoken student who often fought with his professors and he dropped out of Harvard after only two years out of dissatisfaction with the education he was receiving. Pell enthusiastically embraced the new technology of the automobile with gusto in the early 20th century, and throughout his life was known for his love of cars despite an automobile accident in 1905 that injured him. Between 1908-1912, Pell went on grand tours of Europe via automobile (at the time a novelty), being driven all around Europe by his chauffer/mechanic as Pell considered himself to be a "gentleman" and would never engage such tasks as changing the tires, which were beneath him. As Pell was so rich that he did not need to work for a living, he rented a house in the south of France, which he used as the base for his European travels. Pell's travels throughout Europe gave him a cosmopolitan outlook and he did not share the instinctive contempt for Europe that many Americans felt. A striking handsome man in his youth, Pell stood out as a tall man standing 6'5 with a big booming voice and his fondness for wearing the most expensive clothing possible. Much like Roosevelt, Pell felt a strong sense of noblesse oblige, namely that the idea that men from wealthy families such as the Roosevelts and the Pells had a duty to help the disadvantaged in American society.

== Politician ==
Pell's political career began as a member of the Progressive committee of Orange County, New York (1912 to 1914). He was elected as a Democrat to the Sixty-sixth Congress (March 4, 1919 – March 3, 1921) and was an unsuccessful candidate for reelection in 1920 to the Sixty-seventh Congress. As Pell admitted at the time, he had effectively destroyed his political career by voting against bonus payments for First World War veterans as he argued that only veterans who had been wounded deserved a bonus payment and he was against giving bonus payments to healthy men with jobs. Pell argued that as a "gentleman", he could not violate his sense of honor by voting for a bill that he did not believe in even as he admitted in the same speech that his vote was going to end any chance of him being reelected to Congress. In the 1920 election, Pell lost in a landslide to the Republican candidate Ogden L. Mills. He was chairman of the Democratic State committee from 1921 to 1926 and a delegate to the 1924 Democratic National Convention. Pell was appointed chairman of the New York State Democratic Party in 1921 largely due to the influence of his friend Roosevelt, who had arranged in a backroom deal for Pell to have the post.

Regarding Prohibition, Pell was a militant "wet" (i.e anti-Prohibition), which put him at odds with the "dry" (i.e., pro-Prohibition) wing of the Democratic Party. In the 1920s, the Democratic Party was badly divided into a rural, conservative wing that was "dry" and anti-immigration vs. an urban, liberal wing that was "wet" and pro-immigration. Pell was one of the leaders of the urban, liberal faction. Through Pell was a WASP (White Anglo-Saxon Protestant), he did not share the widespread anti-Catholicism and anti-Semitism of the time, and he was quite willing to work with Catholic and Jewish politicians. He fought against the power of the Ku Klux Klan, which was a major force in the Democratic Party at the time and represented the most extreme version of the xenophobic "dry" faction of the Democrats. Pell held the rural population of the United States in contempt, writing that "no intelligent person born on a farm has reached reproductive age without leaving for the city" and owing to the tendency of the intelligent to leave for the city that "the result is the present farming population of the United States stupid, suspicious, illiterate and dishonest". Much of his disdain for the rural population reflected his frequent battles with conservative Democrats from predominately rural states, especially those from the South.

He described the 1924 Democratic National Convention, which pitted the urban and rural wings of the Democrats into a ferocious political battle as "that terrible convention". The 1924 convention brought together "dry" fundamentalist Protestants from the rural areas and small towns of the West and the South who found themselves uneasily rubbing shoulders with "wet" Jewish and Catholic politicians from the big cities of the Northeast and the Midwest. At the 1924 convention, Pell had fought hard for a resolution that condemned the Klan, which failed after 61 ballots. In a letter to editor of the Afro-American newspaper The Pittsburgh Courier, Pell wrote about the Klan that "any group or organization which is attempting to organize for political action along racial or religious lines is fundamentally opposed to the best principles of Americanism...I do not take much stock in extreme theories of race...And I cannot believe that any race today is made up entirely of supermen while none worthy of preservation in any other". At the 1924 convention, Pell had followed Roosevelt and supported nominating the Governor of New York state, Al Smith, who was strongly opposed by the rural fundamentalist Protestant wing of the Democrats who hated Smith for being both a "wet" and a Catholic. The "dry" faction of the Democrats had rallied behind William Gibbs McAdoo, the former Treasury Secretary while the "wets" preferred candidate was Smith. Pell personally disliked Smith and only supported him because Roosevelt did. On 14 August 1924, Pell issued a statement to the press that read: "The Ku Klux Klan violates the fundemental principle of American government by its fight against tolerance and by its interference with and open contempt for the constitutionally organized courts of law". Pell was an occasional lecturer at Columbia University, Harvard University, and other colleges and universities. He also served on the advisory committee of Yenching University, later merged with Peking University.

Owning to his inability to work with Smith, Pell retired from politics in January 1926. After retiring as chairman of the New York Democratic State committee, Pell left for an extended visit to Europe. Like many members of the Lost Generation, Pell disliked the puritanical atmosphere in the 1920s United States-which was best exemplified by Prohibition-and much preferred the more permissive atmosphere of Europe. Pell initially settled in Florence, but he came to dislike the atmosphere of Fascist Italy and soon moved to Paris. He wrote that the Italian people had accepted Fascism out "of a combination of apathy, selfishness and fear". In March 1927, he divorced his first wife in Paris and remarried within two weeks, an action that was considered scandalous as upper class Americans generally did not get divorces in the 1920s. The fact that both he and his ex-wife were remarried shortly after being amiably divorced strongly suggests that both parties had fallen in love with other people. Pell then settled in Vienna while making frequent trips to Germany and France. In 1928, when Roosevelt was elected governor of New York state, which Pell welcomed and inspired him to return to the United States. In a letter to Roosevelt dated 1 January 1929, Pell wrote: "Of course, I am more of a radical than you, but the national election of 1924 showed very definitely that the business community was not interested in honest government and the election of 1928 convinced me that the great finance organizations of the country were ready to strain every nerve and stoop to any depth...Every time we have tried conciliating these people we have failed or have been corrupted".

The Wall Street stock clash of 1929 and the Great Depression led Pell to advocate far-reaching reforms as he argued the capitalism needed to be reformed to save it from itself. He saw his duty to be a "good steward" who would maintain the family fortune to pass on to his son, which required the continuance of the capitalist system, which he believed to be impossible with millions of American left unemployed by the Great Depression. Pell was widely denounced within his social milieu as a "traitor to his class", a "rebel" and a "radical". From 1929 onwards, Pell had been urging Roosevelt to run for president in the 1932 election as he argued that the United States needed a "sanely radical" president who would carry reforms to end the Great Depression. Pell was overjoyed when Roosevelt won the 1932 election, and supported his New Deal reforms that he launched in 1933. Pell's reputation as a "radical" ensured that Roosevelt was unwilling to offer him any position besides for being U.S. minister to Bulgaria, which Pell rejected. On 17 April 1934, Pell was at the White House for a ceremony to mark the end of the American occupation of Haiti attended by Roosevelt and President Sténio Vincent. Much to Pell's surprise, Roosevelt invited him to join him in his conversations with Vincent. As both Pell and Roosevelt were fluent in French, both spoke to Vincent in that language about their hopes for Haiti now that its independence was being restored after being occupied by the United States since 1915. In 1936 he was vice chairman of the Democratic National Campaign Committee. By 1936, many of the more conservative Democrats had felt that the New Deal had gone too far, and going into the 1936 election, Roosevelt had asked Pell to serve on the Democratic National Campaign Committee to provide a loyalist who would fend attacks from within the party.

== Minister in Lisbon ==
Pell was appointed as Minister to Portugal, where he served from May 27, 1937, until February 11, 1941, when he was appointed Minister to Hungary. Pell was appointed minister to Portugal largely in order to keep Roosevelt informed about the extent of German intervention in the Spanish Civil War. The regime of António de Oliveira Salazar was hostile towards the Spanish Republic and Lisbon was a key point in the transshipment of German arms to the Spanish Nationalists. Arms from Germany were normally sent via ship from Hamburg to Lisbon and from there were moved via rail into Spain. Pell also reported that 5, 000 Luftwaffe pilots had gone into Spain via Portugal, a claim that was not widely believed within the State Department, but was later shown to be correct. Through he only served as a minister in Portugal, Pell very closely followed the war in Spain and started to predicate another world war was inevitable. In a dispatch to Roosevelt in September 1937, Pell wrote: "The fascist movement is not simply a petty tyranny, but a new religion which has already produced plenty of fanatics, a good many hypocrites, some martyrs and human sacrifices. It cannot be combated as a theory of government or even an appeal to self-interest". In his reports to Roosevelt (Pell usually ignored the Secretary of State Cordell Hull) Pell ventured well beyond his remit of handling relations with Portugal to cover European politics in general. In a dispatch to Roosevelt in March 1938, Pell wrote: "Looking at the international situation from here, I can only say that everything looks bad and even the most hopeful are those who say it has looked bad for a long time. The Fascist countries seem to firmly believe the British will never abandon their program of surrender...that they will have enough to buy peace instatements every year". Pell reported that the British minister to Portugal had told him that the government of Neville Chamberlain was determined to seek a settlement with Germany by opening talks on the return the former German colonies in Africa to the Reich, which was one of the central demands of Nazi foreign policy, which Pell saw as outrageous, arguing that technically the former German African colonies belonged to the League of Nations with Britain only the administering power and that putting millions of black Africans under Nazi rule was a high price to pay for peace. Both Roosevelt and Pell agreed that the world seemed headed for another catastrophic war that would be even worse than the First World War with Roosevelt at one time writing to Pell "where will it all end?"

During the Sudetenland crisis of 1938, Pell essentially abandoned his post in Lisbon to monitor the crisis from Italy, France and Britain, only returning to Portugal in October 1938 after the crisis had ended. About the situation in the United Kingdom, Pell reported: "I believe Chamberlain has rather divided than united his people, but if the crash comes, they will united quickly enough". The Sudetenland crisis was ended by the Munich Agreement on 30 September 1938. In his assessment of the Munich Agreement, Pell wrote to Roosevelt: "There can be no doubt that Chamberlain bet the future of the British Empire on Hitler's integrity. I think he will lose". During the Danzig crisis in the summer of 1939, Pell returned to the United States to encourage Roosevelt on policy of attempting to persuade Congress to revise the Neutrality Acts to allow the United States to sell munitions to Britain and France in the event of war as the best way of deterring Germany from invading Poland. On the morning of 1 September 1939, Pell was sleeping in at a hotel in New York when his valet woke him up to tell him that Germany had just invaded Poland earlier morning. After conferring with Roosevelt, Pell rushed back to Lisbon. Pell later stated that the war had transformed Lisbon from the "dullest and least important post in Europe" to "a place that really amounted to something" as Portugal's status as a neutral country rich in crucial minerals, an extensive coastline on the Atlantic ocean, and an empire in Africa along with bits of Asia made Portugal highly important to both sides. Pell also noted that Lisbon was the favorite port of departure for refugees seeking passage to the New World as he wrote to Roosevelt "Refugees in all stages of discomfort and poverty" kept arriving in Lisbon and that "I have seen men and women who suffered danger, torture and pain" to make it to Lisbon.

In July 1940, Pell dinner several times with the former British king, the Duke of Windsor (formerly King Edward VIII) and his American wife, Wallis Simpson, who were waiting in Lisbon for a ship to take them to the Bahamas where the duke was to serve as governor. Pell was greatly disturbed by the defeatist and pro-Nazi views expressed by both the duke and the duchess. In a report to Hull, Pell stated that the duke of Windsor was harboring hopes of taking back his lost throne and would dismiss Winston Churchill as prime minister with a new prime minister who would make peace with Germany. He warned that both the duke and the duchess were "indiscreet" and "outspoken" in expressing their feelings about the war. About their plans for going to Nassau, the duke and the duchess first planned to stop in New York for a shopping trip and then planned to go to the Bahamas. Pell warned that the former king should not be allowed to visit New York, saying the presence of the duke and the duchess would attract an immense amount of attention from the American media, and that the tendency of the couple to be "indiscreet" would be a huge propaganda victory for Germany. Isolationism was a strong force in American politics and Roosevelt's policy of a pro-British neutrality was extremely controversial. Pell was concerned that if the duke and the duchess expressed their real feelings about the war, it would undermine Roosevelt's policy as it would be highly damning for a former British king to be telling American journalists that Britain's cause was hopeless in face of the power of Nazi Germany. Pell's advice was taken up and he was instructed to inform both the duke and the duchess that they were not welcome in the United States. In October 1940, Roosevelt wrote to Pell to tell him: "It is really more helpful to me than you probably realize to have you in Lisbon at this moment which in my judgement is the best listening post we have in Europe under the present conditions". Roosevelt greatly valued Pell's reports and in January 1941 decided to move him to Hungary in order the report on the war situation from a state in Eastern Europe that was neutral, but very closely aligned with Germany both politically and economically. Roosevelt gave Pell the choice of serving as the American minister-plenipotentiary in either Egypt or Hungary. Pell disliked the idea as serving in Cairo as he had disgusting rumors' about the corpulent, corrupt and very childish King Farouk and by contrast had heard more pleasant about the dignified, gentlemanly Admiral Miklos Horthy of Hungary, so he chose to serve as the American minister-plenipotentiary in Budapest.

== Minister in Budapest ==
In the spring of 1941 the wealthy Pell travelled in style from Lisbon to Budapest, going in a caravan that consisted of a limousine, a station wagon and a truck for carrying all of his belongings. Pell's trip took him across Portugal, Spain, France, Switzerland, and Germany. On 20 May 1941, Pell presented his credentials to Admiral Miklós Horthy, the Regent of Hungary. Before arriving at Royal Castle to present his credentials, Pell asked to wear a business suit, a request that was refused by Admiral Horthy. Horthy told Pell that he could be ordered about "by that damned little corporal" (Horthy's insulting nickname for Hitler, whom he strongly disliked), but as the Regent of Hungary he was a man to be respected and told Pell that he would be only received at Buda Castle wearing a proper diplomatic uniform. The same day, Pell sent a personal report to Roosevelt where he described his impressions of the Reich. He reported of the Wehrmacht that "neither German Army nor anything else is unbeatable, but it will certainly take a lot to beat them".

During his time in Budapest, Pell lived at the luxurious Ritz Hotel. The chambermaid for Pell's room at the Ritz Hotel was able to obtain access for Pell's safe and sold all his letters to and from Roosevelt to German intelligence. Pell did not speak Magyar, but he was fluent in French and German, both languages which the Magyar aristocracy were fluent in. Pell was popular with the Magyar aristocracy-who dominated Hungarian society at the time-who saw him as being a sort of quasi-aristocrat. Pell's wife, Olive Pell, was a talented painter, which made her the object of much curiosity for the Magyar aristocracy who adhered to extremely patriarchal values. Franklin Gunther Mott, the American minister to Romania wrote to Roosevelt: "Last week I visited Budapest...I found the Pells in great form. Bertie is already a popular figure with his leonine head and giant stature, and the Buick station wagon in which he generally drives about unfailingly collects a crowd. They are much liked and admired and the fact that he is an old friend of yours loses nothing in the telling." Mott added that Pell was unusually intelligent, writing: "As an Ruskin once remarked: "For one hundred people who can talk, there is only one man who can think, but for the thousand who can think there is only one who can see'". As a diplomat, Pell was known for his dislike of the rigid rules of the State Department and for his opposition to isolationism. He took a tough anti-fascist stance, believing that the Axis powers and Nazi Germany in particular were intent upon the conquest of the world and that it was absurd to believe that the United States could stay out of the war that he believed to be inevitable. After arriving in Hungary, Pell wrote to Roosevelt that with France defeated and Britain on the verge of bankruptcy that the United States would have to intervene in the war, writing: "During the next epoch of history, the world will be led either from Berlin or Washington. There is no hope of anything else. It will not be the Archangel Michael, but Adolf Hitler and his successors, who will direct a military autocracy from Berlin or it will be you and yours-not Gabriel who will direct things from Washington. I see no alternative".

Pell described László Bárdossy, the Hungarian prime minister and foreign minister, in a dispatch to Washington as: "a very cultivated man with a great deal of diplomatic experience but extremely weak". Pell disliked Dietrich von Jagow, the German Minister in Budapest, saying he was "in many ways a boorish little fellow". In April 1941, Hungary granted Germany transit rights to invade Yugoslavia, leading to Britain to break off relations with Hungary. The United Kingdom nominated the United States to be the protecting power in Hungary and as such Pell represented British interests in Budapest.

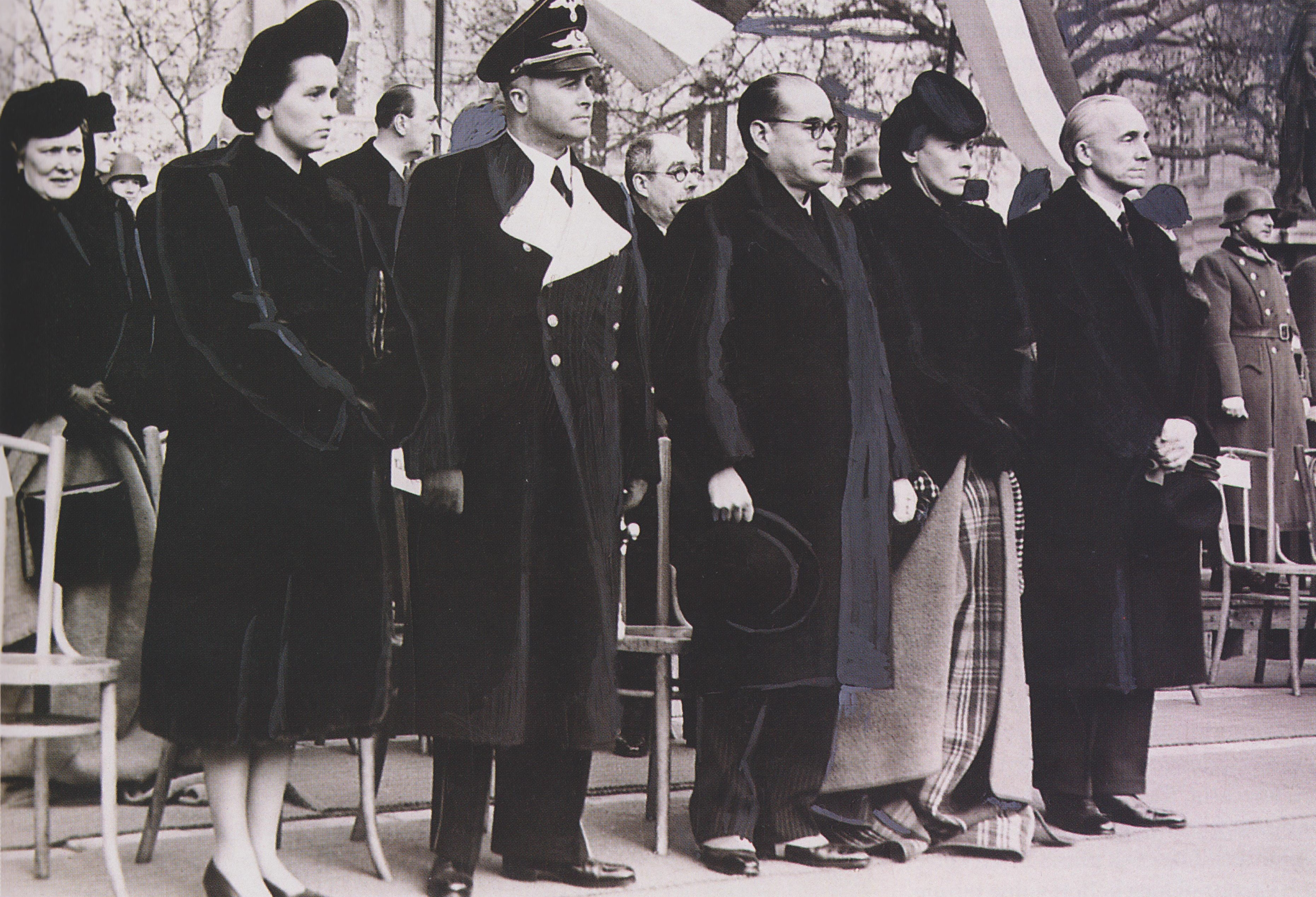
The German minister Dietrich von Jagow (second from the left) and the Hungarian prime minister/foreign minister László Bárdossy (the last man on the right) at a rally in Budapest on 6 December 1941. Pell had adversarial relations with both Jagow and Bárdossy during his time in Budapest.

In the summer of 1941, Bárdossy, claiming that Hungary was being overwhelmed with Jewish illegal immigrants from Galicia, ordered the Hungarian gendarmes and police to round up and deport all of the Jews from Galicia. Pell, who closely followed the deportations, met with Bárdossy numerous times to complain that the Jews expelled as illegal immigrants were the subject of much abuse and were being massacred in Galicia. Pell also told Bárdossy that his claims to be expelling illegal immigrants was wrong as many of the Galician Jews who had settled in the Ruthenia region of Hungary were refugees and that his policies were "a violation of the right of asylum which is generally granted by sovereign countries to refugees". In an attempt to rebut Pell's allegations, Bárdossy gave him on 2 August 1941 a copy of an order from the Interior Minister Ferenc Keresztes-Fischer dated 30 July 1941 that called for only expelling Polish Jews and Russian Jews living in Hungary and called for their humane treatment. Bárdossy privately admitted that Keresztes-Fischer's order was a "theoretical proposition' and that in fact the police and gendarmes were expelling any Jew suspected of being an illegal immigrant with much brutality. Bárdossy consistently lied to Pell, telling him that he had seen no evidence that any of the Jews being expelled were ill-treated and denied that there were massacres in Galicia.

Pell was on good terms with Bárdossy, but he also held him in contempt privately as he described Bárdossy as a man who was aware that his policies towards the Jews were wrong, but who was unwilling to do anything to change his policies. Pell felt that Bárdossy was a fundamentally morally weak man. The expulsions of the Galician Jews from Hungary in the summer of 1941 left a lasting impression on Pell, who was appalled by both the brutality of the expulsions and about the widespread apathy of the Hungarian people who did not seem to be particularly outraged by what was happening. The climax of the expulsions was a massacre committed in Kamianets-Podilskyi on 26–27 August 1941 where all of the Jews expelled from Hungary as illegal immigrants were shot down by the SS, Ukrainian collaborators and Honved (Royal Hungarian Army) troops. At Kamianets-Podilskyi, SS forces had the command of SS-Obergruppenführer Friedrich Jeckeln had four huge pits were dug into the earth and then 23, 600 men, women and children were forced to line up and were then shot.

On 5 December 1941, on behalf of the British government Pell delivered an ultimatum from the British Foreign Secretary Anthony Eden to Bárdossy, saying that if the Hungarian Expeditionary Force sent to fight on the Eastern Front was not withdrawn by midnight of the same day, then His Majesty's Government would "would have no alternative but to declare the existence of a state of war between the two countries". Bárdossy, who was something of an Anglophobe, took on an arrogant and sneering tone, saying that the British government should not dare to dictate to the Hungarian government about what it could or could not do. Pell tried hard to prevent the declaration of war, saying if only Bárdossy could say something about a possible withdrawal of the Expeditionary Force, then perhaps the British might reconsider, but Bárdossy refused to take the opening. Bárdossy spoke with what Pell described it an "air of aggrieved innocence" as he denounced what he called an outrageous British ultimatum. On the morning of 6 December 1941, Pell went to the prime minister's office to inform Bárdossy that the United Kingdom of Great Britain and Ireland was now at war with the Kingdom of Hungary.

On the morning of 11 December 1941, Pell was in his office at the American legation when an aide rushed in to tell there was especially important announcement on Radio Berlin, which turned out to be Hitler addressing the Reichstag to declare war on the United States. Pell later recalled: "There was this screaming on the radio which was in a language and accent and at a speed which was beyond any German of mine". He was serving in Budapest on December 13, 1941, when he received the Hungarian declaration of war against the United States. After the Reich declared war on the United States on 11 December, the other states that had signed the Tripartite Pact of 1940 such as Hungary were informed that they were also expected to declare war on the United States. Bárdossy drafted at a special meeting of the Council of Ministers a statement calling for Hungarian support for the other states of the Tripartite Pact and for breaking off diplomatic relations with the United States, but did not necessarily mean declaring war. Bárdossy first told Pell that Hungary was only going to break relations and was not going to war. On 12 December 1941 the diplomat György Barcza wrote in his diary: "Pell said yesterday evening he had been with Bárdossy, who visibly agitated, had informed him Hungary was breaking off relations with America. Pell, who is a good friend of ours, told me that he had tried to feed Bárdossy, as an explanation for the communiquė, the suggestion being that under foreign pressure, the Hungarian government had no option, but Bárdossy had interrupted him and replied in a raised voice there was no question of foreign pressure. The government was breaking off diplomatic relations with the United States independently of the others, of its own free will. Pell tried again to make an impression on Bárdossy, as he would have liked to contrive that when he presented himself to report, he could tell Roosevelt something in favor of Hungary along the lines that having been placed under terrible German pressure and duress, we were compelled to break relatiosn with the USA. But Bárdossy did not want to take Pell's well intentioned hint and stuck by his assertion that there was no question of foreign influence on us; the step had been decided by the government and that was all there was to it". However, Jagow then told Bárdossy that he wanted a declaration of war. On 15 December 1941, Bárdossy informed Pell that Hungary was now at war with the United States. Pell offered him a way out, saying: "I suppose you are doing this under heavy pressure from Germany and that the declaration of war reflects no hostility on the part of the people of Hungary towards the people of the U.S.A?" Bárdossy was much offended, shouting at Pell "Hungary is a sovereign and independent state...Her government and her people are entirely at one."

Pell along with the rest of the American diplomats in Hungary were interned on St. Margeret's island in the Danube river and he left Hungary on 16 January 1942. Under armed guard, Pell traveled via train though Hungary, Croatia, Italy, France and Spain to reach Lisbon. He did not finally return to the United States until 1 June 1942. He closed the legation in Budapest, left for the U.S. on January 16, 1942, and submitted his resignation on November 30, 1942. He was United States representative on the United Nations War Crimes Commission from August 1943 to January 1945.

== United Nations War Crimes Commission ==
Upon his return to the United States, the State Department led by the Undersecretary of State Sumner Welles (the man who actually ran the State Department as Roosevelt had a low opinion of his Secretary of State Cordell Hull) resisted finding Pell work again. In the spring of 1943, Roosevelt personally intervened by ordering Hull and Welles to appoint Pell to an important position and on 16 June 1943 Roosevelt wrote to Pell saying he wanted him to represent the United States on the newly formed United Nations War Crimes Commission in London. On 28 June 1943 the White House released a press statement saying that Pell was to serve as the American representative on the United Nations War Crimes Commission. The Commission had its origins in a speech given before the House of Lords by Lord Simon on 7 October 1942 who argued that the Allies needed some sort of organization to collect evidence of war crimes before holding any war crimes trials. Simon's speech in turn reflected increasing evidence that had been coming in from occupied Europe that the Reich was waging a campaign to exterminate all of the Jews in Europe, which had led to demands in both the United Kingdom and the United States to take some sort of action. However, the Foreign Office intended the commission more for show than for action. In a memo sent to the Foreign Secretary Anthony Eden dated 30 July 1943, Dennis Allen, the diplomat in charge of war crimes, wrote: "We should I think, get ourselves into an impossible position if we once admitted that all crimes committed by the Nazis against Jews are to be classed as war crimes...As they stand, our proposals do not cover crimes against stateless Jews".

The opening of the commission had been delayed by a lengthy Anglo-Soviet dispute as the British had announced that all of the Dominions would have separate delegations, which the Soviets objected to under the grounds that none of the Dominions had been occupied by the Axis powers and the presence of the Dominions (whom the Soviets believed would follow the British lead) were meant to increase British voting power on the commission. The State Department led by Welles resented Pell as a troublesome outsider, and did not even inform Pell for months that the War Crimes Commission had begun its work in London. The State Department did not want Pell serving on the commission, and both Hull and Welles had lobbied Roosevelt to appoint Francis Biddle, the U.S. attorney general, instead. An American diplomat had informed the British at the time of Pell's appointment that he was a failed politician who had been given the assignment because he was one of Roosevelt's friends. Pell was unknown in London, and a diplomat with the British embassy in Washington, J. Foster, was sent out to find out more about Pell. Foster reported to London that: "Mr. Pell is not unintelligent but seems very set in his ways". Information received via the Red Cross suggested that for the most part the Germans were treating British and American POWs reasonably well, and many officials in both Washington and London believed that promises to hold war crimes trials would lead to retaliation against Anglo-American POWs. By contrast, German forces had treated Soviet POWs right from the launch of Operation Barbarossa in a very brutal fashion, which meant that Soviet officials had no fear of any retaliation against their POWs, which led for the Soviet government to take a hard line on punishing war crimes.

In August 1943, Pell wrote to Roosevelt to ask when he could finally depart for London as he wanted to provide hope for "the oppressed of Europe". In the summer of 1943, the State Department was in crisis owning to a long-brewing sex scandal. In September 1940 Welles while intoxicated on a train had made homosexual advances towards two Afro-American Pullman porters. Roosevelt who was on the same train at the time was aware of the incident and chose to ignore it. However, William Bullitt, the embittered former ambassador to France who blamed Welles for his inability to obtain another senior post, had waged a determined campaign to oust Welles, charging that Welles's fondness for sex with black men made him unsuitable to be undersecretary of state. Hull, who had hated the way that Welles had overshadowed him, had formed an alliance with Bullitt against Welles. Hull had found it deeply humiliating that it was Welles rather than himself who went abroad with Roosevelt for meetings with Winston Churchill and other British leaders, and was determined to oust Welles from the State Department. To that end, Hull and other senior State Department officials, most notably Green Hackworth, had leaked information about the 1940 incident on the train to Bullitt. Bullitt met with Roosevelt in July 1943 and told him to either sack Welles or else he would go to the press to out Welles, forcing Roosevelt to very reluctantly fire Welles. Hull, who used Bullitt as a tool for firing Welles, was overjoyed and now turned his attention towards Pell. Like Welles, Pell was a former Harvard student and a close friend of Roosevelt's, and just for those reasons alone, Hull was determined to have Pell sacked. The Soviets suggested that the chairmanship of the commission should rotate on a monthly basis between the British, Soviet, American and Chinese representatives, a proposal that was vetoed by Hull simply because he could not stand the thought of Pell serving as the chairman of the commission. Roosevelt had been enraged by the way that Hull had used Bullitt to end the career of Welles, and only the fact that he needed Hull to maintain the support of the conservative Southern Democrats in Congress for his administration kept him from sacking Hull. Hull was from Tennessee and had served in Congress as a Democrat before being appointed as Secretary of State in 1933, and he still had ties with the Southern Democrats in Congress, many of whom felt that Roosevelt had gone too far with his New Deal reforms and were starting to align themselves with the Republicans against the Roosevelt administration. Roosevelt's distaste for Hull led him to consistently back Pell against his own Secretary of State.

On 2 September 1943, Roosevelt wrote to Hull to ask him why Pell was not in London, leading to the Secretary of State to say he would look into the matter. The Commission held its first meeting in London on 26 October 1943 while Pell was still writing angry letters to the State Department demanding to know when he could finally leave for London. Hull was determined that Pell should not serve on the commission and kept him in the dark as to when he could finally leave for London. On 19 November 1943, Pell met with Green Hackworth, the State Department's legal adviser, and complained in a letter to Roosevelt that Hackworth had failed to explain to him what he was to do in London. Pell saw himself as a "gentleman" and always took on a quasi-aristocratic style. He did little to disguise his disdain for Hackworth as a "careerist" lawyer who was no "gentleman". Pell wrote: "Hackworth was well named. He was a little legal hack of no particular attainments. He was manifestly not a born gentleman and acquired very few of the ideas of a gentleman on his way up in the world. His manners were bad, his fingers were dirty, he was clearly unused to good society". He had wanted to take along with him to London Paul Lineus, a public relations man in the oil industry, and Sheldon Glue, a law professor at Harvard as his aides, but both of his choices were vetoed by the State Department. The State Department imposed upon him a lawyer from the Legal Division, Lawrence Preuss, as his legal adviser, which made for a difficult working relationship as Pell strongly disliked Preuss. Pell was unable to obtain any instructions from the State Department as what he was to do on the Commission and finally left for London via ocean liner in November 1943. On 15 November 1943, Pell boarded the Queen Mary ocean liner in New York to take him to England. The State Department had refused him permission to take along his wife to London, a ruling that very much embittered Pell who thought that this was a typical example of Hull's "malice" towards him. Only after Pell complained to Roosevelt did the State Department finally relent and allow Mrs. Pell to join her husband in England. On the voyage to England, Pell read one book, a biography of Antoine Quentin Fouquier-Tinville, which impressed him deeply with the problems of dealing with a tyrannical state. Pell considered himself to be a statesman who was laying out the basis of a post-war world order and did not see himself as performing the bureaucratic role of collecting evidence of war crimes. Just before he left for London, Pell wrote a long letter to Hull in which he wrote that he saw his role as preventing another world war, which he believed only be achieved with a harsh peace towards the Germans. He concluded his letter that World War Three would be inevitable unless the German people were shown that that "war is not a profitable business" and declared his intentions to be "tough" on the Germans. Much of Pell's hardline stance was influenced by his memories of what he had seen in Hungary in the summer of 1941 and his knowledge that he people he had seen expelled from Hungary had all been massacred.

When Pell arrived in London on 2 December 1943, he received a letter from Hull saying that the Commission was only a fact-finding body and he was not to make policy regarding war crimes. Ignoring Hull's instructions, Pell fought hard in the winter of 1943-1944 to expand the definition of crimes that the Nazis could be indicted for and proposed a new category of crimes, namely crimes against humanity. The chairman of the commission, Sir Cecil Hurst, had wanted a narrow definition of war crimes as violations of the laws and customs of war as laid out in Hague Conventions of 1899 and 1907. The phrase crimes against humanity had been first used in a declaration issued in London in May 1915 by the governments of Britain, France and Russia regarding the Armenian genocide as the three governments had promised to bring to trial the leaders of the Committee of Union and Progress for the genocide after the defeat of the Ottoman empire. Pell used the London declaration of 1915 as arguing that there was a basis for indicting the Nazi leaders for crimes against humanity. In 1919, the British had arrested and indicted 63 leaders of the Committee of Union and Progress for crimes against humanity in the Armenian genocide, but the planned trial had never occurred. The Treaty of Lausanne in 1923 had declared a general amnesty for the Armenian genocide, which marked the end of any effort to prosecute Turkish officials. However, Pell argued that the very fact that British indicted Turkish leaders for the "Armenian massacres" as the genocide was known at the time was a sufficient precedent trying German leaders for crimes against humanity. However, the way that Turkey after 1923 was seen as a success story and learned in a pro-Allied neutrality in the Second World War was seen by some officials as evidence that the general amnesty approach for war crimes was the best way of making peace. Pell's demands for prosecuting the Nazi leaders for crimes against humanity was strongly supported by the Czechoslovak representative Bohuslav Eċer and the Belgian representative Marcel de Baer who both felt that Hurst's approach was too narrow. Pell argued that the existing category of war crimes was not sufficient given the overwhelming evidence that the Jews of Europe were subjected to genocide and the new category of crimes against humanity was needed to properly account for the Holocaust.

Pell further noted that under Hurst's approach the Nazi leaders could only be indicted for crimes against people who were citizens of a state, which excluded stateless people. Pell argued that the Nazis and their allies had stripped Jews of their citizenship, which meant that under Hurst's definition of war crimes no-one could be prosecuted for crimes against these people. In 1935, all German Jews had been stripped for their German citizenship, which had been applied to Austrian Jews after the Anschluss. Romania had stripped all Romanian Jews of their citizenship in February 1938 and Hungary had reduced all Hungarian Jews down to a second-class citizenship status under the Second Anti-Jewish Law of May 1939. Pell argued that it was egregious to not prosecute people involved in atrocities against German, Austrian, Hungarian and Romanian Jews just because the victims were stateless people. He argued Hurst was attempting to create a perverse incentive for states to engage in genocide since any government wishing to practice genocide merely had to strip the victims of their citizenship first, which under Hurst's definition meant all the perpetrators would enjoy total immunity just because the victims were stateless. Reflecting his stained relationship with Hull, Pell informed him in March 1944 that he already introduced the crimes against humanity as an criminal offense and had won Roosevelt's support, actions which clearly annoyed Hull who felt that Pell had exceeded his authority. With the support of Roosevelt, Pell informed the commission that he wanted crimes against humanity committed "against any persons because of their race or religion" as the best way to handle the Holocaust perpetrators. Throughout his time on the commission, Pell ignored the State Department as much as possible and instead talked directly with Roosevelt. On 16 February 1944, Pell wrote to Roosevelt to ask for his support in bringing in the crimes against humanity as he complained that the State Department was actively opposed to his plans. Pell felt that some sort of international court would be needed to try the Nazi leaders as there were crimes in every nation occupied by the Reich, and it would not be practical to try the Nazi leaders in national courts for that reason. Pell also counseled speed as he predicted that once the Allies won the war, there was "no power on God's green earth" that could stop the victims of Nazism from taking private revenge, which would lead to a situation of anarchy all over Europe. Pell's call for an international court was the origin of the International Military Tribunal which conducted the Nuremberg trial of 1945-1946.

Pell's legal adviser, Preuss, had been openly insubordinate towards Pell and uncooperative at meetings of the commission, which made for a strained working relationship. Preuss had told the Foreign Office along with governments-in-exile in London that Pell was a hopelessly incompetent failed politician only appointed because he was an old friend of Roosevelt's and that no-one should listen to Pell as his views were not those of the United States government. He further added that he was the "real brains" of the American delegation and everyone should ignore Pell. Preuss had acted as a spy on Pell, writing reports deeply critical of his actions, which were sent to Durward Sandifer, the chief of the Division of Political Studies at the State Department and to Green Hackworth, the chief of the State Department's Legal Division. In report in February 1944, Preuss wrote to Sandifer that Pell was much too concerned about the Holocaust and that he was serving Jewish interests instead of American interests at the commission. Pell was shocked when Preuss contradicted him at a meeting of the commission, saying that his plans violated international law and were impractical, which led to a lengthy shouting match. Pell who did not get along very well with Preuss believed that there was a conspiracy within the State Department to discredit him and that Preuss was acting on the orders of Hull. In March 1944, Pell received a secret report from a British Army general serving in Italy on German war crimes against Italian citizens, which he had ordered that no copies were to be made of. Preuss was allowed to read the document, which he then ordered his secretary to make a copy of. Pell's secretary, Joyce Grisby, discovered what had happened and reported Preuss to Pell. Preuss made matters worse by lying, claiming that he not made a copy of the British report, which was contradicted when the copy was found in his office. In late March 1944, Pell sent Preuss back to Washington, where he was promptly promoted. In a letter to Roosevelt, Pell complained bitterly that Preuss had been promoted for his "disloyalty" to him. The way that the war crimes trials at Leipzig in the 1920s had proved to be a fiasco led for much of the State Department and the Foreign Office being opposed to war crimes trials again. In a more general sense, it was widely believed in both the Foreign Office and the State Department that the Treaty of Versailles was too harsh on Germany, and it was to avoid the supposed mistakes of Versailles that led many Anglo-American officials to favor a soft peace with the Germans who were to be forgiven for almost everything that they had done. Pell's consistent advocacy of a harsh peace with the Germans led for him to be seen in the corridors of power as a trouble-maker whose plans would cause another world war, and that was really needed was a soft peace.

Pell tended at first to ignore Asia in favor of Europe in large part because the "Germany First" grand strategy indicated that the Reich would be the first to be defeated with victory over Japan to occur at some later day. It was not the U.S Navy's successful raid on the Japanese naval base at Truk in February 1944, which crippled the Imperial Japanese Navy by destroying its main base in the Pacific, that American officials first began to seriously plan for war crimes trials for Japanese leaders. Until the Truk raid, it was assumed that Japan would be defeated sometime in the late 1940s. In London, Hurst tended to be skeptical of the "wild" reports of Japanese atrocities and was worried about the costs of trying Japanese officials. Pell regarded Hurst as Eurocentric in his approach, charging that he was too cautious in his approach to war crimes in Asia and that his view of Japan as "just a distant ally of Nazi Germany" was too forgiving. As the vast majority of the victims of Japanese atrocities were their fellow Asians, Pell felt that Hurst seemed less concerned about Japanese atrocities than he did with German atrocities in Europe. The Chinese delegation was the one most concerned with prosecuting Japanese war criminals as China was easily the commission member that had suffered the most from Japanese atrocities and following a speech by Chiang Kai-shek which labelled the Japanese "an evil race" put forward wide-ranging plans for several tribunals for conducting war crimes trials in Asia. The Chinese "evil race" approach put aside the presumption of innocence and essentially assumed that anyone who had served in the Imperial Japanese Army or the Imperial Japanese Navy was a war criminal. Given the scale and extent of Japanese atrocities in China since 1937, which had caused the deaths of millions, Pell felt that the anger expressed by the Chinese delegation was justified, but argued conducting war crimes trials without the presumption of innocence was problematic.

The French, Belgian and Dutch delegations on the commission placed far greater emphasis on German atrocities in their homelands and were largely indifferent to reports of atrocities in distant Asia. Both the French and Dutch delegations told Pell that the accounts of Japanese atrocities in their colonies of French Indochina (modern Vietnam, Laos and Cambodia) and the Dutch East Indies (modern Indonesia) would be investigated when Japan was defeated and their overwhelming concern were accounts of German atrocities against their own people in France and the Netherlands. With strong support from the Australian delegation (who were gravely concerned about reports of Japanese atrocities against Australian POWs), Pell was able to successfully champion a Chinese motion for an international military tribunal to try Japanese leaders after the war. Pell had a friend and ally in the form of the Australian judge Sir William Webb, the Chief Justice of the Supreme Court of Queensland, who had been tasked by Canberra with investigating reports of Japanese war crimes against Australian POWs in the Pacific campaign. In a letter to Pell, Webb wrote that most Australians were simply happy than the projected Japanese invasion of Australia had never occurred and accounts of the mistreatment of Australian POWs were being overshadowed by reports of genocide in Europe. Webb wrote that "people here as you yourself have seen on more than one occasion are rather apt to forget the Japanese side of the global conflict" and the "Japanese war criminals must not go free". Webb wrote that he was willing to serve as the "chief booster" of Pell's call for "fair and just trials for the Orient".

Pell played a central role in pushing for a more broader definition of the commission's work as he felt that the existing category of war crimes were not sufficient to cover the Holocaust. Against the State Department and the Foreign Office, Pell had pushed for punishing the Nazi leaders for crimes against German citizens and above all German Jews. He further wanted the period for prosecuting the Nazi leaders to start on 30 January 1933 (the day Adolf Hitler was appointed Chancellor by President Paul von Hindenburg) instead of 1 September 1939 (the day Germany invaded Poland). Pell's demands for a broader time frame for prosecuting war crimes was strongly supported by the Chinese delegate on the commission, Wellington Koo, who complained that Japan had invaded China on 7 July 1937, but because officially the two nations did not declare war until December 1941 that all of the Japanese war crimes in China prior to December 1941 were not subject to prosecution. There had been no declarations of war in the Sino-Japanese war as both sides want to avoid having American neutrality being invoked, which forbade selling any war related material to nations at war. Koo had wanted the starting point for investigating Japanese war crimes to be 18 September 1931 (the day that the Japanese seized the Manchuria region of China), a demand that the British were opposed to under the grounds that China and Japan were not at war in 1931 and that treating all of the Japanese policy from 1931 onwards as a criminal conspiracy would lead to awkward questions for the other Allied powers. The Czechoslovak representative Bohuslav Eċer, had wanted to treat all of German policy towards Czechoslovakia from the time of the Sudetenland crisis onward as a criminal conspiracy, which the British furiously objected to. Because the Munich Agreement of 30 September 1938 had ended the Sudetenland crisis, Eċer's proposed purview of the time frame could possibly implicate the British government in the said conspiracy. Pell was not a lawyer and did not understand nor care about that international law as defined at the time, leaders could be prosecuted by another state for crimes against citizens of another state and not for crimes against citizens of their own state. Pell felt that it was profoundly wrong that the Nazis had legal immunity for everything that they had done to the German Jewish community as this was considered to be an internal German matter, and pressed for prosecuting the Nazis for everything that had happened in Germany since 1933.

The issue for Pell was not just academic. In response to learning about Horthy's attempts to sign an armistice with the Allies, on 19 March 1944 Hitler had launched Operation Margarethe and occupied Hungary. After Hungary was occupied, the Hungarian Jewish community who been protected until then, were subjected to extermination. The Regent of Hungary, Admiral Miklós Horthy, had been forced to dismiss his Angolphile prime minister, Miklós Kállay, whose government had signed a secret armistice with the British in September 1943, and replaced him with the pro-Nazi General Döme Sztójay. Unlike the liquation of the Polish Jewish community between 1941-1943, the extermination of the Hungarian Jewish community in 1944 attracted more attention at the time, and Pell was well aware of the genocide in Hungary. Through the SS was in overall charge, the actual work of rounding the Hungarian Jews for extermination was done by Hungarian civil servants, policemen and gendarmes. Pell was enraged by the fact that because this considered to be an internal Hungarian affair that no Hungarian official could be tried by an international court for their actions. Pell wrote a memo urging that a press statement be issued warning the Regent of Hungary, Admiral Horthy, his prime minister General Sztójay, and all officials of the Hungarian state that read: "Let them know they cannot escape the inexorable punishment which will be melted out to them when the power of the evil men now in control of Hungary has been broken". Roosevelt approved of Pell's statement which was read out to the American press by Hull. In August 1943, a resistance group inside the Auschwitz-Birkenau death camp had produced a report on the camp that had been smuggled out and in turn had reached the Polish government-in-exile in London. The Polish Foreign Minister Count Edward Raczyński had in turn passed on the report to the commission, where it had been read by Pell. In a letter to Hull dated 20 June 1944, Pell reported that the Hungarian Jews were being exterminated and that: "It seems to me manifest that something will have to be done to punish such actions, and the clearer we make it that certain punishment will follow, the more effective will be our effort to prevent repetition of such things". In July 1944, the Red Army liberated the Majdanek death camp near Lublin, and the news was given wide publicity in the Soviet press. Pell used the Soviet reports about Majdanek to argue that there was no doubt that all of the stories that he had been hearing about genocide in Europe were true and it was time for the United States to take a firm stand on punishing the perpetrators.

Pell also took a hard line on who could be tried for crimes against humanity and war crimes as he insisted that anyone who was involved should be tried and argued against the "St. Helena solution" of only trying a few Nazi leaders while letting the rest escape punishment. Pell argued the solution applied to France after 1815 where Napoleon was exiled to St. Helena while almost all of his followers escaped punishment would only permit the rise of Nazism in Germany again. He stated that letting the lesser offenders escape justice because they were "just following orders" would show the Germans that genocide paid and the only way to deter the Germans to punish everyone involved in war crimes and crimes against humanity. Pell argued that the average German "would be very much lessened if their last recollection of their revered Gestapo uncle was of that gentleman being hanged". He stated he was seeking deterrence, not revenge as he noted that "all the executions in the world cannot revive a single child...will not assuage grief". His zeal for punishing the Nazis was greatly influenced by how the Lost Cause legend had influenced how most American understood their history. The British historian Dan Plesch wrote that Pell saw "how Confederate veterans in the South had created for themselves a misty-eyed mythology about the US Civil War and was determined that the Nazis would not do the same". At one meeting of the commission, Pell mentioned the "Lost Cause" legend and warned that if the St. Helena solution were adopted: "In a small German village, the local member of the Gestapo will be the hero...He will tell young boys of the fun of shooting Jews in Poland, or the profit of looting France...Presently will come someone hopeful of succeeding Hitler.". On 29 May 1944, Hurst issued a ruling that genocide against the Jews regardless of location or the legal status of the victims was within the purview of the commission and should be tried by international courts, a ruling that delighted Pell.

Pell's crusading zeal on the Commission make him enemies in both Washington and London. The State Department, the Navy Department and the War Department all favored the St. Helena solution and only Pell's friendship with Roosevelt saved him from being sacked as many powerful people regarded Pell as a troublemaker who was meddling in matters outside of his concern. Pell also faced strong opposition from the British government. The British Foreign Secretary Anthony Eden was only interested in prosecuting German officials responsible for atrocities against British POWs-especially those executed under Hitler's Commando Order-and was opposed to Pell's wide-reaching plans to prosecute every Nazi leader for everything that they had done since 1933. Eden also felt that Pell's plans would hinder the return of a "peaceful atmosphere" in Europe after the war, encourage the Germans to fight on rather than surrender and would encourage atrocities against British POWs. In July 1944, Pell wrote to Roosevelt to complain that Eden was refusing to answer his letters about the Holocaust while also noting that the State Department was treating him like a pariah. The U.S. War Secretary Henry L. Stimson wrote to Roosevelt to oppose Pell on 9 September 1944, writing that American courts could not try German citizens for crimes against other German citizens as American courts "would be without jurisdiction in precisely the same way that any foreign court would be without jurisdiction to try those who were guilty of, or condoned, lynching in our country." The final report of the Commission, which was issued in October 1944, largely reflected Pell's ideas such as the demand that the Nazis be tried in military courts; the rejection of the St. Helena solution and the insistence that all of the Nazis would be brought to trial; and the new category of crimes against humanity would be the basis for indicting the Nazi leaders. In December 1944, Pell returned to the United States to attend the wedding of his son Claiborne Pell, In early 1945, Hull retired and was replaced with Edward Stettinius Jr., whom Pell called "one of the stupidest men that I have ever known."

On 9 January 1945, Pell had his last meeting with Roosevelt when he had lunch at the White House. The State Department had finally found a way to remove Pell by not including his $30, 000 annual salary in its request for the budget from Congress and since Congress did not include the office of American representative on the United Nations War Crimes Commission in the 1945 budget, Pell was now unemployed Stettinius had used the budgetary procedure to rid the State Department of Pell and persuaded Roosevelt to go along with his plan. Just before the meeting, Stettinus had asked Roosevelt if he had wanted to tell Pell that he was sacked. Roosevelt replied in a brief memo: "To ERS Jr. ok—You do it—at last FDR". Not until after his lunch with Roosevelt did Pell learn that he had just been sacked. Just after his lunch at the White House, Pell was informed by Hackworth that he just been fired, which led to a angry scene as Pell demanded to know why had no-one had told him the news before his meeting with the president. Hackworth told Pell that he was Roosevelt's appointee, not the State Department's, a remark that deeply hurt Pell On 24 January 1945, the acting Secretary of State, Joseph Grew, told Congress that Pell's employment with the State Department had been terminated. The Israeli historian Arieh Kocavi wrote: "Roosevelt evinced no established conception on the treatment of war criminals and never gave any careful consideration to the question. His statements during the height of the war were not aimed at deterring the Germans but mostly at placating the governments-in-exile and encouraging the occupied peoples to endure...Being drawn into the discord between the State Department and Pell, Roosevelt at first employed parallel channels to avoid taking sides. By not instructing Pell to coordinate positions with the State Department, the president led him to assume, wrongly, that he could safely continue his course of action in the face of the department's dissatisfaction. Roosevelt's support of the State Department stand in the end was the result of a combination of both convenience and indifference. It was easier to abandon a political friend, whose views seemed to be unpopular within influential circles of the administration, than confront the newly appointed secretary of state, who supposedly was supported by the secretaries of war and the navy. If Roosevelt had not considered the war criminals problem to be marginal and had given it greater consideration, he probably would have learned that by the end of 1944, several of Pell's principal proposals, including the matter that concerned him the most-Germany's crimes against its own nationals-were receiving growing support within the administration, most notably by the secretary of war". Pell believed that he was ousted due to a plot, writing in his memoirs: "There was no question that I was the victim of a conspiracy largely engineered by Hackworth and G. Howland Shaw [an assistant secretary of state], I couldn't say who gave the orders and who took them, but they were among the group that deliberately sabotaged the instructions of the President for their own advantage."

Pell's firing set off a media firestorm in both the United States and the United Kingdom, making the headlines in newspapers in both nations. The New York Post ran a headline reading "Pell Fired for Plan to Avenge Jews", noting that Pell's strong line on punishing Nazi war criminals had annoyed a number of officials in both Washington and London who preferred the St. Helena solution of punishing a few Nazi leaders. The Daily Express in London ran a cover story with the title "Hang all Gestapo Says the Dismissed Mr. Pell". In that article, Pell was quoted as saying: "The entire Gestapo must be hanged, whether they number 100,000 or 200,000. They are voluntary murderers, and nobody forced them into joining". The New York Herald Tribune ran a cover story where Pell was quoted as saying that only by punishing all of the Nazi criminals could the peace of the world be saved. The Washington Post reported that Pell's demands to "punish far down the line" as opposed to trying only a handful of the Nazi leaders was the real reason why he had been fired as a number of powerful people in both Washington and London much preferred the St. Helena solution.

Pell's firing him into a hero to the American Jewish community and he was received by Albert Einstein as the guest of honor at a party to celebrate the publication of the Jewish Black Book, an early expose of the Holocaust. Freed from his official duties, Pell proclaimed his support for Zionism and argued that Britain should end the Palestine Mandate at once in order to create a Jewish state. In his speeches, Pell launched a full frontal attack on the British White Paper of 1939, which had sharply limited the number of Jews allowed into the Palestine Mandate. In April 1945, Pell was the lead speaker at a "Never Back to the Ghetto" rally held in New York, where he stated: "The second policy of action of the United Nations, but first of all of our own great and glorious nation, is the restoration of the Hebrew people of Europe and Palestine to life, dignity and political status. We must give the Jewish survivors a choice, we have to grant them the right to self-determination and to decide whether they want to go back to the ghettos...or whether they want to take up a new life as a distinct national unit and go back to that country on the eastern shores of the Mediterranean which they for millions of years considered their national territory". Public opinion in both the United States and the United Kingdom strongly favored Pell. The Washington Post in an editorial entitled "The Pell Affair" on 30 January 1945 declared: "The real question was whether the Allied nations had the right to punish Nazi atrocities against Jews. President Roosevelt, as well as Mr. Pell thought they did, but the narrow-minded legalists in the State Department, finding no legal precedence for punishment demurred. Lacking precedence, these experts favor delay, apparently until more volumes can be thumbed". On 1 February 1945, Grew in a press statement denied that the Roosevelt administration favored the St. Helena solution and declared its support for Pell's position for punishing all war criminals, not just the leaders. On 3 February 1945, the Foreign Office in London issued a similar press release that declared HM Government's support for Pell's position. On 24 April 1945, Pell issued a statement to the American press which read: "The hideous mass murders which have horrified the world have been no surprise to me, and they should not surprise the lawyers of the State Department who are to a great extent responsible for them." Pell succeeded in changing American policy on the question of crimes committed by the Nazis against German citizens and in the late 1940s, American military courts operating in the American zone of occupation in Germany convicted several SS and Gestapo officers of crimes against German citizens. However, he failed to change to British policy and in the war crimes conducted by the British military courts in the British occupation zone, no German official were prosecuted for crimes against German citizens as this was deemed to be outside the purview of British law. Kochavi concluded: "On the surface, Pell lost his struggle. In reality, he succeeded in advancing several of his ideas, even though the cost was high-the end of his public career".

== Last Years ==
After Roosevelt died on 12 April 1945, Pell tried to meet the new president, Harry S. Truman, with the aim of getting a new appointment with war crimes work, but Truman did not know Pell and declined to meet him. Pell retired to his estate, Pellbridge, in Hopewell Junction in New York state. He spent his last years of his life devoted to leisurely pursuits and travel. He described himself as "an old man with hope" as he felt that the Nuremberg War Crimes trial of 1945-1946 and the Tokyo War Crimes Trial of 1946-1948 had established a new precedent in international law. He was modest in his self-appraisal of his work on the commission, saying that "right comes not so much from the efforts of those that are supporting it as from the deadlock of those who are supporting something else".

== Personal life ==
In November 1915, he married Matilda Bigelow (1895–1972), daughter of Nelson Pendleton Bigelow. Before their divorce in March 1927, they were the parents of:

- Claiborne de Borda Pell (1918–2009), a U.S. Senator from Rhode Island who served for 36 years from 1961 until 1997.

In June 1927, Matilda married Hugo W. Koehler (1886–1941), a commander in the United States Navy who served as a naval and State Department special agent in Russia during its civil war in 1920. Two weeks later in Paris, Pell married Olive Bigelow Pell (1886–1980), the portraitist. Olive Bigelow was the daughter of Poultney Bigelow (1855–1954) and granddaughter of John Bigelow (1817–1911), the U.S. Ambassador to France under Presidents Abraham Lincoln and Andrew Johnson.

Pell died on July 17, 1961, in Munich, West Germany at the age of 77, while touring Europe with his grandson, Herbert Pell III. His funeral was held at Trinity Church in Newport, Rhode Island where there is a memorial plaque in his honor. His ashes were committed to the ocean off Beavertail in Jamestown, Rhode Island.

=== Descendants ===
Pell was the great-grandfather of Herbert Claiborne Pell IV (b. 1981), a candidate for Governor of Rhode Island, who married two-time Olympic medalist Michelle Kwan (b. 1980).

=== Honors and commemorations ===
The Herbert Pell Cup in yachting is named for Pell.

U.S. House of Representatives
Preceded by John F. Carew	Member of the U.S. House of Representatives from New York's 17th congressional district 1919–1921	Succeeded by Ogden L. Mills
Party political offices
Preceded by William W. Farley	New York State Democratic Committee Chairman; July 1921 – January 1926	Succeeded by Edwin Corning
Diplomatic posts
Preceded by Robert Granville Caldwell	U.S. Envoy Extraordinary and Minister Plenipotentiary to Portugal; 1937–1941	Succeeded by Bert Fish
Preceded by John Flournoy Montgomery	U.S. Envoy Extraordinary and Minister Plenipotentiary to Hungary; 1941	Succeeded by None – Legation closed December 1941
