= Charles H. Thomas =

Charles H. Thomas may refer to:

- Charlie Thomas (politician) (Charles Humbert Thomas, 1915–1976), Progressive Conservative party member of the Canadian House of Commons
- Charles H. Thomas (sports executive) (1876–1968), one-time president of the Chicago Cubs
- Charles H. Thomas (diplomat), former United States Ambassador to Hungary
