= Breaking the Real Axis of Evil =

2003 book by Mark Palmer

Breaking the Real Axis of Evil: How to Oust the World's Last Dictators by 2025
- Author: Mark Palmer
- Genre: History, Politics
- Publication date: 2003

Breaking the Real Axis of Evil: How to Oust the World's Last Dictators by 2025 is a 2003 book by Mark Palmer, the former United States ambassador to Hungary. In the book, Palmer recounts the life histories of the world's remaining dictators, their vulnerabilities, and strategies for removing them from power, usually through non-violent means. He asserts that the world's dictators are the cause of terrorism and poverty in the Middle East and Africa, and are the "major security threat to [the United States], their neighbors, and the world."

== The Forty-Five Least Wanted ==
In this chapter, Palmer profiles each of what he sees are the world's 45 remaining dictators, separating them into groups. He argues the list should be similar to the FBI's Ten Most Wanted Fugitives and that it should be updated annually.
