= John Flournoy Montgomery =

American businessman and diplomat

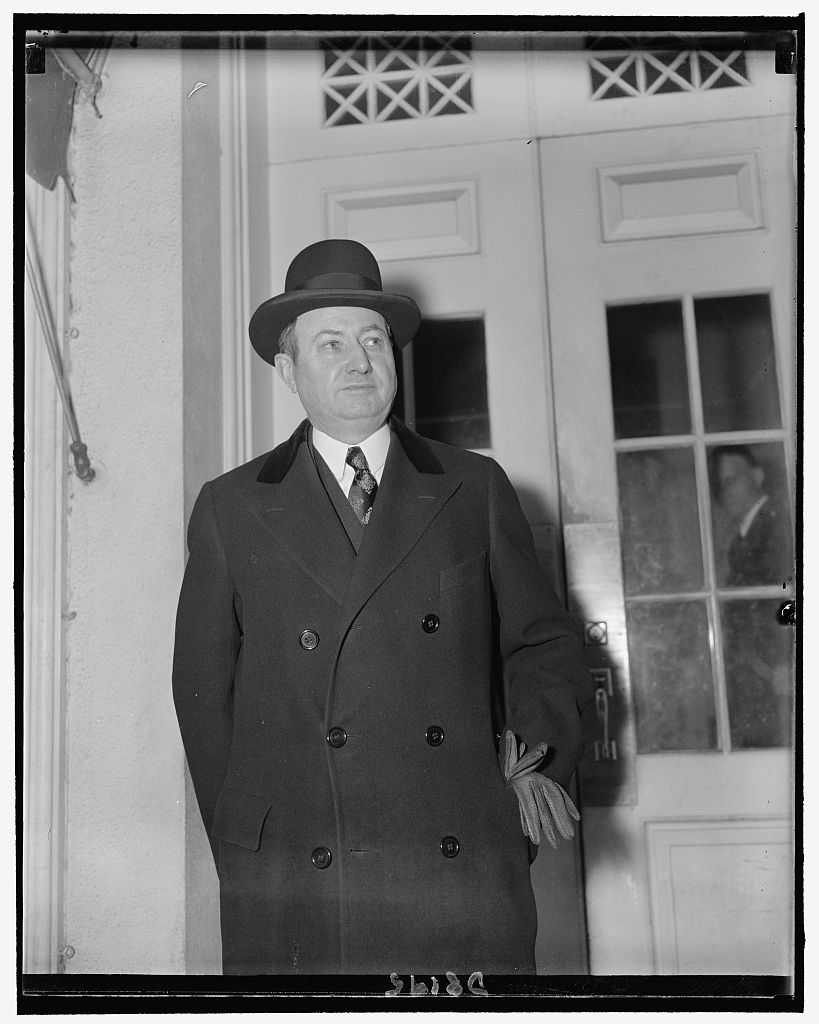
- Montgomery at the White House in 1940
- Born: September 20, 1878; Sedalia, Missouri, United States
- Died: November 7, 1954 (aged 76)
- Occupation: Diplomat
- Title: Envoy Extraordinary and Minister Plenipotentiary to Hungary
- Term: June 13, 1933 – March 17, 1941
- Predecessor: Nicholas Roosevelt
- Successor: Herbert Pell
- Political party: Democratic Party
- Spouse: Hedwig Wildi
- Children: 3

John Flournoy Montgomery (September 20, 1878 – November 7, 1954) was an American businessman and diplomat. His sole diplomatic posting was as U.S. Minister to Hungary, between 1933 and 1941. This ambassadorial assignment placed Montgomery at the center of the seething intrigue and gathering storm that characterized 1930s Hungary and Central Europe; in particular he was witness to the rise of Adolf Hitler's influence in Budapest, and the complex struggle over the alliance between Hungary and Nazi Germany. His memoirs, entitled Hungary: The Unwilling Satellite, provide a first-person report of that era.

== Background ==
Montgomery was a native of Missouri, born September 20, 1878, in the town of Sedalia and educated there. At the age of 26, he married Hedwig Wildi; the couple had two daughters. Montgomery built a successful career in the dairy industry, specifically in the processing of condensed milk. From 1925 to 1933, he was the president of the International Milk Company in New Jersey. He was a loyal and generous supporter of the Democratic Party, and after Democrat Franklin D. Roosevelt claimed the White House in 1932, Montgomery was rewarded with the promise of a diplomatic job.

== Budapest posting ==
In June 1933, Montgomery was sworn in as U.S. Minister to Hungary (he had hoped to be sent to Vienna, but Budapest was what he was offered). Montgomery was clearly expected to watch over the political intrigues not only in Budapest but, from his central location on the Danube, to monitor the goings-on in Hungary's neighbors (Austria, Czechoslovakia, Romania, Yugoslavia) and other countries in the region as well, including Bulgaria, Poland, Germany and Italy. Roosevelt invited Montgomery to report to him personally, an opportunity the ambassador took occasionally.

Although he had no experience as an international diplomat, Montgomery proved to be an enthusiastic and dedicated ambassador. He cultivated hundreds of friendships among the Hungarian and European political class, with whom he socialized regularly; he faithfully dictated records of almost every conversation he held with important political players, and kept a detailed journal. He avidly collected and recorded information about his many contacts, including their earlier jobs, their families and hobbies, and even gossip he heard about them from his other friends.

At the same time, Montgomery's effectiveness was limited by his background. He spoke only English, which restricted most of his meaningful contacts to those Hungarians and other Europeans who had studied English themselves: primarily educated aristocrats and members of the ruling political elite. His inability to read local newspapers or understand casual conversations in the street meant that Montgomery was cut off from much of the Hungarian capital's busy middle- and working-class political scene.

Montgomery was also plainly charmed by Budapest's Gilded Age atmosphere, and enchanted by the capital's old-world pageantry – the elaborate costumes and glittering, semi-feudal rituals to which Hungary still clung in the inter-war period. In particular, he was won over by the considerable charisma and personal charm of Hungary's head of state, the regent Miklós Horthy.

== Montgomery and the rise of Hitler ==
Unquestionably the most critical trend which Montgomery was required to monitor from Budapest was the rise of Adolf Hitler and the Nazi regime in Germany - and Hitler's growing influence in Hungarian political circles. Like many American diplomats, Montgomery was suspicious of Hitler from early in the dictator's reign. Roosevelt shared those feelings, and the ambassador's scathing reports on Hitler delighted the president.

The Hungarian leadership was aware of American hostility toward Hitler's Nazi regime; as Hungary crept deeper into Hitler's sphere of influence throughout the 1930s, Horthy and his colleagues took pains to assure Montgomery that they, too, disliked and feared Hitler – a message which Montgomery dutifully passed back to Washington, as they doubtless hoped he would.

What Hungary's various leaders actually thought of Hitler and alliance with Germany is the subject of a debate that lasts to the present day. Much of the political elite in Budapest, including Horthy himself, was genuinely wary of Hitler. The German Fuehrer was generally seen as a dangerous but useful ally, and certainly too powerful to ignore. He clearly had his own designs on Hungary's natural resources, and after the 1938 Anschluss in Austria, Hitler had a well-equipped army standing directly on Hungary's borders.

At the same time, Horthy, like most of the political class, was virulently anti-Communist. He had helped put down Hungary's short-lived Communist revolution in 1919, and now he was gambling that Hitler would protect Hungary from Joseph Stalin's "Asiatic barbarians." Like many of its neighbors, Hungary had its own home-grown fascist movements and extreme right-wing politicians; a genteel anti-Semitism was embedded in elite Hungarian culture. Horthy was also committed (as was virtually every Hungarian) to re-acquiring territories which had been carved away from Hungary as part of the Treaty of Trianon at the end of the First World War. (With Hitler's help, some of these territories would be re-annexed by Hungary between 1938 and 1940.)

Montgomery's Hungarian friends convinced him that Hungary's capitulations to the Nazis were unavoidable, the only possible path for a weak nation facing a well-armed and ruthless neighbor. As Montgomery wrote in Hungary: The Unwilling Satellite:

Hungary's inclination was to side with the Allies, but circumstances made it not so much a question of what the people would like to do but what they knew they had to do. Hungarians may feel now that their leaders made mistakes, and they certainly did, but in my opinion, no matter what policy had been adopted at any particular time, the result would have been exactly the same.

In this, Montgomery echoed the stance of the regent Horthy, who wrote in his own memoirs:

It is easily said that we should have preferred to engage in a hopeless struggle rather than to submit to Hitler's demands, and such a view reads well on paper. In fact, it is total nonsense. An individual can commit suicide, a whole nation cannot. For Hungary's tragedy was that, for the first time in her history, she saw herself simultaneously threatened on all sides…. I cannot see how fundamentally we could have acted differently. No one in his senses can deny that our fate would in any case have been the same.

This similarity of opinion is not unusual: a comparison of Horthy's memoirs and Montgomery's yields a broad alignment of their views, especially regarding Hungary's political choices before and during the Second World War.

The friendship between Montgomery and Horthy was cemented during a famous episode on March 15, 1939. Both men were attending a gala performance at the Budapest Opera House, when supporters of the fascist Hungarian Ferenc Szálasi (recently jailed on Horthy's order) disrupted the opening ceremonies by chanting, from a box above the regent's, "Justice for Szálasi!" Horthy, enraged, dashed out of his royal box, and Montgomery followed to see what was happening. When he caught up with Horthy, he reported that:

...two or three men were on the floor and he [Horthy] had another by the throat, slapping his face and shouting what I learned afterward was: "So you would betray your country, would you?" The Regent was alone, but he had the situation in hand…. The whole incident was typical not only of the Regent's deep hatred of alien doctrine, but of the kind of man he is. Although he was around seventy two years of age, it did not occur to him to ask for help; he went right ahead like a skipper with a mutiny on his hands."

Horthy apparently believed that Montgomery was coming to offer help, because he thanked Montgomery later with a gift of a photograph of the opera event, a present which Montgomery treasured. The two men became close (according to Tibor Frank, a Hungarian scholar who closely studied Montgomery's private papers, Montgomery even shared Horthy's "drawing-room anti-Semitism," and viewed the pre-war anxieties of Budapest's large Jewish upper-middle class with a mixture of sympathy and condescension). Montgomery did his best to foster a sense of personal connection between the regent and President Roosevelt – a connection which Horthy apparently felt, but which Roosevelt did not. On the whole, Montgomery felt that Roosevelt held him at arm's length, and complained that FDR was insufficiently curious about real reports from the field.

== After Budapest ==
Montgomery was recalled from his posting Budapest in March 1941, three months before Hungary finally joined the Axis as a full war partner during the invasion of the Soviet Union. When the United States entered the Second World War that December, Horthy's alliance with Hitler placed the minister's beloved Hungary in America's enemies column; but Montgomery remained committed to Hungary's independence and well-being. He viewed with anguish the destruction of virtually half the capital during the Battle of Budapest, and he bitterly mourned the ceding of Hungary to Soviet control at the war's end.

Montgomery also remained committed to the well-being of Miklós Horthy, who was captured by American troops at the war's end: as the Allies prepared for the Nuremberg Trials, Montgomery used his influence in Washington to help extricate Horthy from indictment and trial. Horthy was interviewed extensively, and later was called to testify at the trial of a Nazi administrator in Budapest, but was never charged for any of his actions during or before the war.

After the trials, Montgomery continued to support the Horthys in their exile (they could not and would not return to Budapest, which was now controlled by a Soviet-led Communist government). After the Horthy family relocated to Estoril, Portugal, Montgomery raised funds for their upkeep from a small committee of wealthy Hungarians in America. After Montgomery died in 1954, his daughter Jean continued supporting the ex-regent and his wife until their deaths.

In 1947 Montgomery published a heartfelt memoir of his Budapest days called Hungary: The Unwilling Satellite. The book was, and remains, a widely read and widely quoted source for examinations of Hungarian pre-war politics, in some measure because it is unique as a thorough Western lens on interwar Hungary; the Soviet-dominated Hungarian leadership after 1947 vilified Horthy and promoted an official view that Horthy was a fascist and a Nazi collaborator.

The stories Montgomery told in The Unwilling Satellite were further illuminated by the discovery, among Montgomery's personal papers, of his own private notes on many of his discussions with Hungary's leaders. These notes were found by scholar Tibor Frank after he met Montgomery's daughter Jean, and was given unconstrained access by her to the Montgomery papers. Frank published many of these notes in the book he wrote based on them: Discussing Hitler: Advisors of U.S. Diplomacy in Central Europe, 1934-1941.

== Works ==
- Hungary: The Unwilling Satellite (1947)
