= Colleen Bell =

American television producer

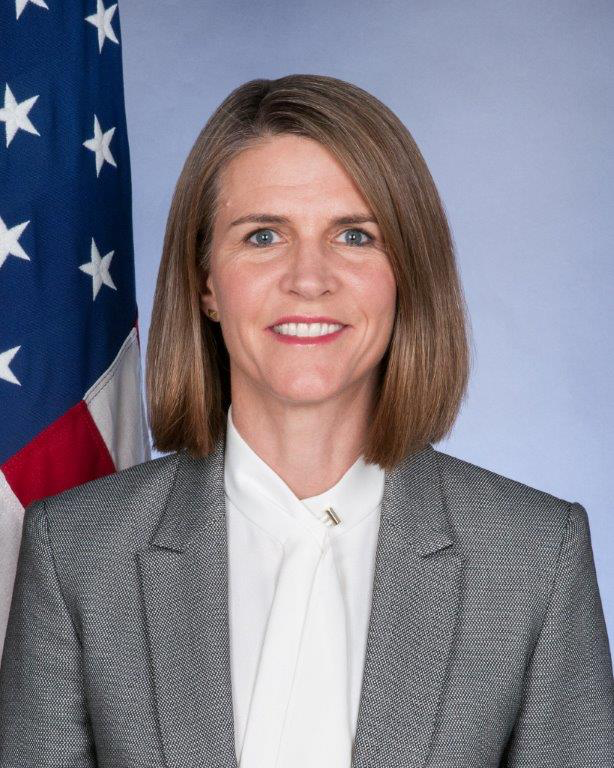

United States Ambassador to Hungary
- In office January 21, 2015 – January 20, 2017
- President: Barack Obama
- Preceded by: Eleni Kounalakis
- Succeeded by: David Cornstein

Personal details
- Born: Colleen Clark Bradley; January 30, 1967 (age 59) Evanston, Illinois, U.S.
- Party: Democratic
- Spouse: Bradley Bell (m. 1991)
- Children: 4
- Education: Sweet Briar College
- Awards: Middle Cross of the Hungarian Order of Merit

Colleen Bell (née Colleen Clark Bradley; January 30, 1967) is an American television producer known for her work on the soap opera The Bold and the Beautiful and for her involvement in various social issues. She was appointed Director of the California Film Commission by Governor Gavin Newsom on May 23, 2019, to manage the state's tax credit program, increase the representation of women and minorities, and promote California as a production locale. She was appointed United States Ambassador to Hungary by United States President Barack Obama and took office on January 21, 2015.

== Early life and education ==
Bell (née Bradley) was born in 1967 in Evanston, Illinois, to Sheila, an interior designer, and Edward Bradley, a lawyer. Bell studied economics and political science at Sweet Briar College in Sweet Briar, Virginia, and graduated in 1989 with a bachelor's degree. She studied her junior year at the University of St Andrews in Scotland.

== Producing career ==
Bell's television career began in 1991 at Bell-Phillip Television Productions, the production company for the CBS soap opera The Bold and the Beautiful. Bell served in various roles for the show, including script supervisor and director of special projects. After leaving the show in 2000, Bell returned several years later as special projects director, and in 2011 led a project to overhaul and update all the fashion on the show, a critical aspect of production because the plot focuses on two rival fashion houses. Bell became a full producer in 2012. As producer, Bell has received three Daytime Emmy Award nominations when The Bold and the Beautiful was nominated for Outstanding Drama Series in 2013, 2014 and 2015.

== Issues advocacy, philanthropy and political involvement ==
Bell is active in issues advocacy and philanthropy. In 2007, she met with then-Senator Barbara Boxer about global warming as part of a delegation from the Leadership Council, a Los Angeles County environmental issues group.

Bell's public service includes initiatives in child abuse prevention, crime victim counseling and care, public health awareness, art accessibility and empowering women. In 2021, she joined Madelaine Albright and Governor Gretchen Whitmer at the National Democratic Institute in a campaign to mobilize the international community to end violence against women in politics.

In 2010, Bell was named to President Barack Obama's Advisory Committee on the Arts, and in 2011 she was elected chairperson. Obama appointed Bell to the John F. Kennedy Center for the Performing Arts Board of Trustees in 2012. Additionally, Bell has served as a trustee of the Los Angeles County Museum of Art, the Los Angeles Music Center, and as vice chairperson of the Children's Institute Inc.

Bell is also active in the Democratic Party, and served as an at-large delegate to the 2012 Democratic National Convention in Charlotte, North Carolina. As a "bundler", Bell helped raise more than $2.1 million for Obama's 2012 presidential campaign. In February 2012, Bell and her husband, The Bold and the Beautiful executive producer and head writer Bradley Phillip Bell, hosted a fundraiser for Obama at their home along with actor Will Ferrell and his wife, Viveca Paulin.

Bell also sits on the Board of Directors at the Atlantic Council, the Pacific Council on International Policy, and the Board of Advisors of Georgetown University School of Foreign Service and the USC Center on Public Diplomacy.

== Ambassadorship ==
=== Appointment and confirmation ===
On November 6, 2013, President Obama nominated Bell to succeed Eleni Tsakopoulos Kounalakis as ambassador to Hungary. Bell was one of three ambassadorial nominees who, according to The Washington Post, came to "symbolize the problems with giving plum overseas diplomatic assignments to big political donors". Senator John McCain questioned Bell's lack of diplomatic experience and knowledge of Hungary. In an article for Politico, James Bruno, a former U.S. career foreign service officer, noted that Bell "could not answer questions about the United States' strategic interests in Hungary". When asked during questioning about American interests in the nation, Bell "stumbled and stammered", replying "the security relationship and also the law enforcement and to promote business opportunities, um, increase trade, um".

Senator Barbara Boxer supported Bell, noting her intelligence and ability to "make friends". The Senate confirmed Bell in a 52-42 vote on December 2, 2014, and she was sworn in on December 16, 2014.

=== Work as ambassador ===
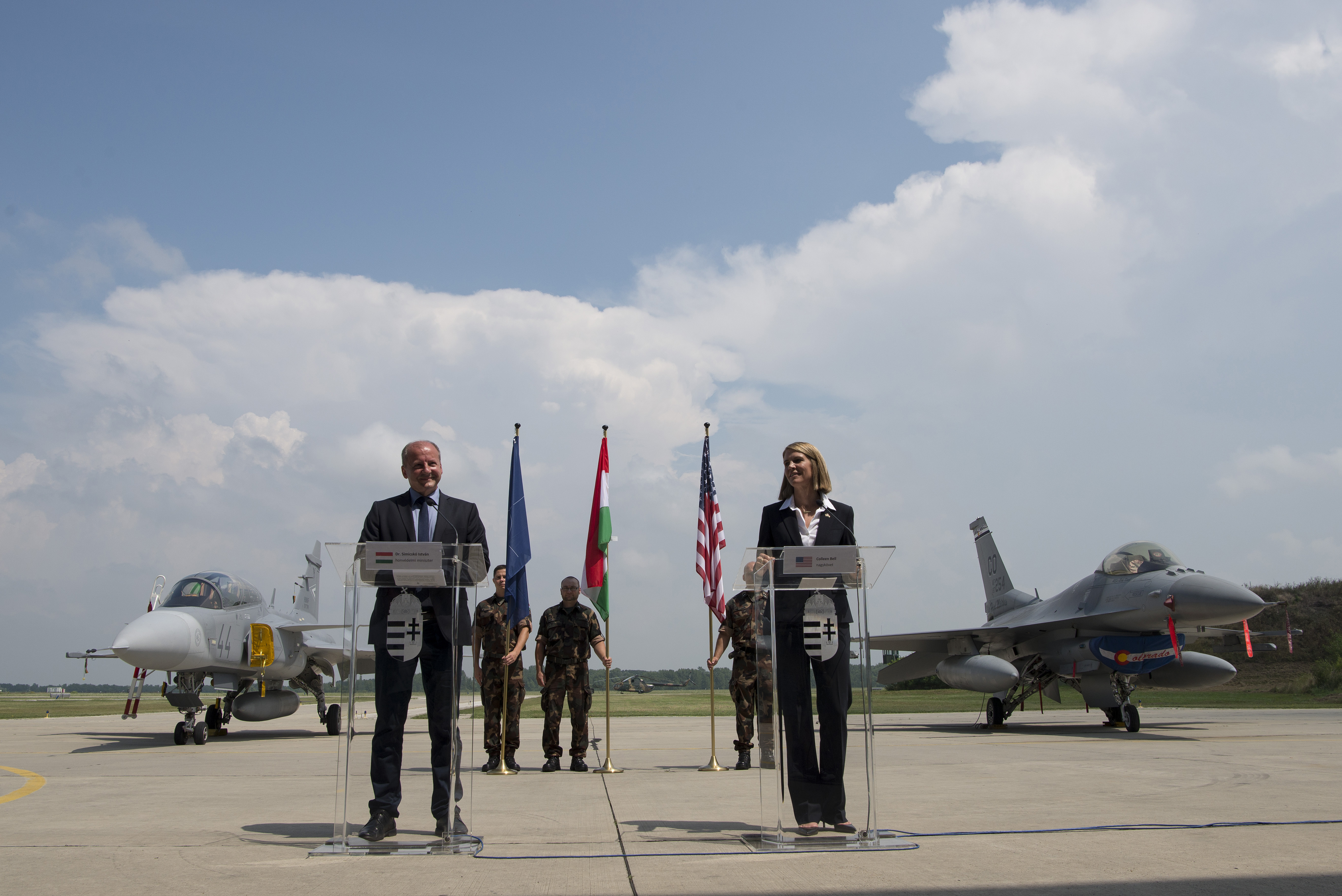
U.S. Ambassador Colleen Bell and Hungarian Minister of Defense István Simicskó speak to troops at Pápa Air Base, Hungary during Operation Panther Strike with a Hungarian Gripen (left) and an American F-16 in the background, July 27, 2016.

On January 19, 2015, Bell arrived in Budapest, ending the 18-month absence of an American ambassador which had existed since Kounalakis departed in July 2013. Bell presented her credentials to President János Áder of Hungary on January 21, 2015.

In February 2015, Bell signed an agreement that, pending ratification by both countries' legislatures, would end dual taxation of U.S. and Hungarian citizens. Speaking at an event held by the American Chamber of Commerce that month, Bell told a forum that transparency and predictability regarding Hungarian business laws and regulations are needed to attract U.S. investors to the country.

Also in February, Bell spoke in support of Ukrainian sovereignty during the ongoing conflict between Ukraine, which is Hungary's northeastern neighbor, and Russia. Bell's comments in support of Ukraine were notable because her remarks to diplomats from NATO member states came as Russian President Vladimir Putin was visiting Budapest.

As the European migrant crisis unfolded in 2015, with people from Syria fleeing that country's Syrian Civil War, Hungary saw the largest spike of migrants per capita from January to June. By October 2015, Hungary had responded by blocking its southern borders with Serbia and Croatia to prevent the influx of migrants. Bell spoke to the press on September 30, stating that her embassy staff had been in regular contact with the Hungarian government, non-governmental organizations and the public on the migrant issue. According to Bell, in addition to information sharing and logistical help, her office gave direct aid to organizations such as the Hungarian Red Cross. While acknowledging that Hungary's sovereignty allows it to choose how to secure its borders, she stated that the U.S. "promote[s] the humane treatment of refugees". She was also critical of Hungarian media's "anti-immigration rhetoric", stating that it "doesn't represent the Hungarian people".

In October 2015, Bell spoke at Corvinus University of Budapest and praised Hungary's efforts to support Ukraine during its conflict with Russia. In addition, she expressed appreciation for Hungary's partnership with the United States and its allies in the areas of counter-terrorism and law enforcement and called for greater economic cooperation between the U.S. and Hungary. She also expressed concern over recent, potentially unfavorable developments in Hungary, including government corruption, a decline in press freedoms, and negative stereotypes with regard to refugees from Syria.

Bell was awarded the Middle Cross of the Hungarian Order of Merit for her work in strengthening the bilateral relationship between Hungary and the United States. In 2016, she also received the Dr. Iván Völgyes Award for business promotion from the American Chamber of Commerce in Hungary along with the Hungarian ambassador to the U.S. Réka Szemerkényi.

Ambassador Bell served until January 20, 2017, as the United States Ambassador to Hungary.

== Personal life ==
On October 4, 1991, Bell married Bradley Phillip Bell, the son of Lee Phillip Bell and William J. Bell, at St. Athanasius Roman Catholic Church in Evanston, Illinois. Together they have four children, daughters Charlotte and Caroline, and sons Chasen and Oliver, and live in the Holmby Hills neighborhood of Los Angeles.

Diplomatic posts
Preceded by Eleni Kounalakis	United States Ambassador to Hungary; 2015–2017	Succeeded by David Cornstein
