= Bailey Banks & Biddle =

Jewelry retailer in Philadelphia, US

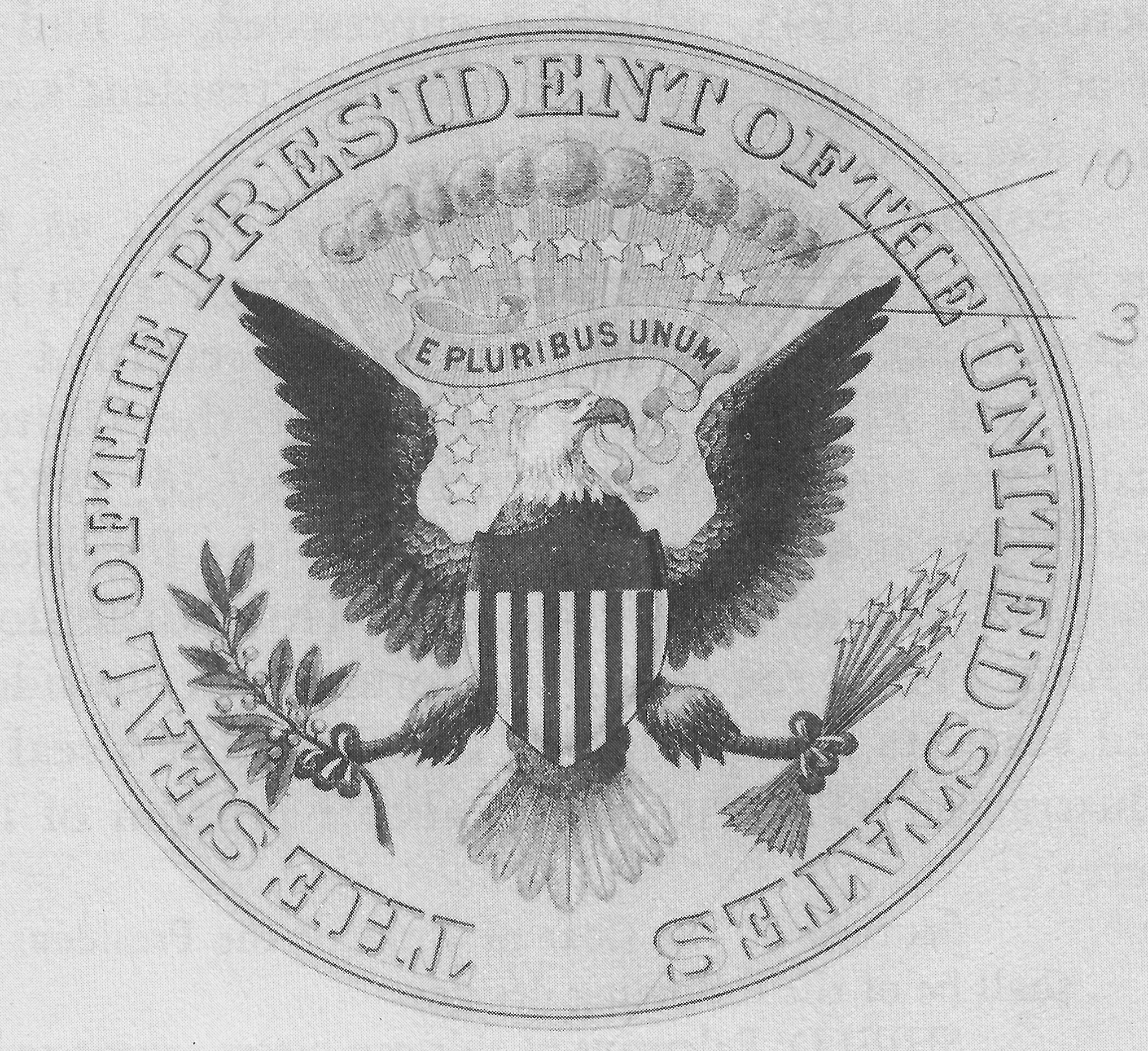
A print of the presidential seal c. 1915, thought to be the one obtained by Woodrow Wilson from Bailey Banks & Biddle

Bailey Banks & Biddle was a retailer of jewelry and designer of US medals that was formed in Philadelphia, Pennsylvania, in 1832.

== History ==
Bailey & Kitchen, as it was originally known, was founded at 136 Chestnut Street, Philadelphia, on September 20, 1832, by Joseph Trowbridge Bailey (1806–1854) and Andrew B. Kitchen (died 1850). The partnership was dissolved in November 1846. It was reformed with new partners as Bailey & Co. in 1841, and on March 1, 1878, again re-established as Bailey Banks & Biddle. From about 1852–1862, the company made its own silver; they were principally supplied by Taylor and Lawrie before 1852, and from about 1862–1870, by George B. Sharp. After 1870, they resold silver from a variety of manufacturers.

At the turn of the century, Bailey Banks & Biddle was commissioned by the U.S. government to update the Great Seal of the United States; its design today remains the official version of the seal. The company also designed and made many of the military medals that are still used today, including the Medal of Honor, the Silver Star, the Legion of Merit, the Bronze Star, the Spanish Campaign Medal and the first 40,000 Purple Hearts awarded, as well as class rings for West Point and Annapolis.

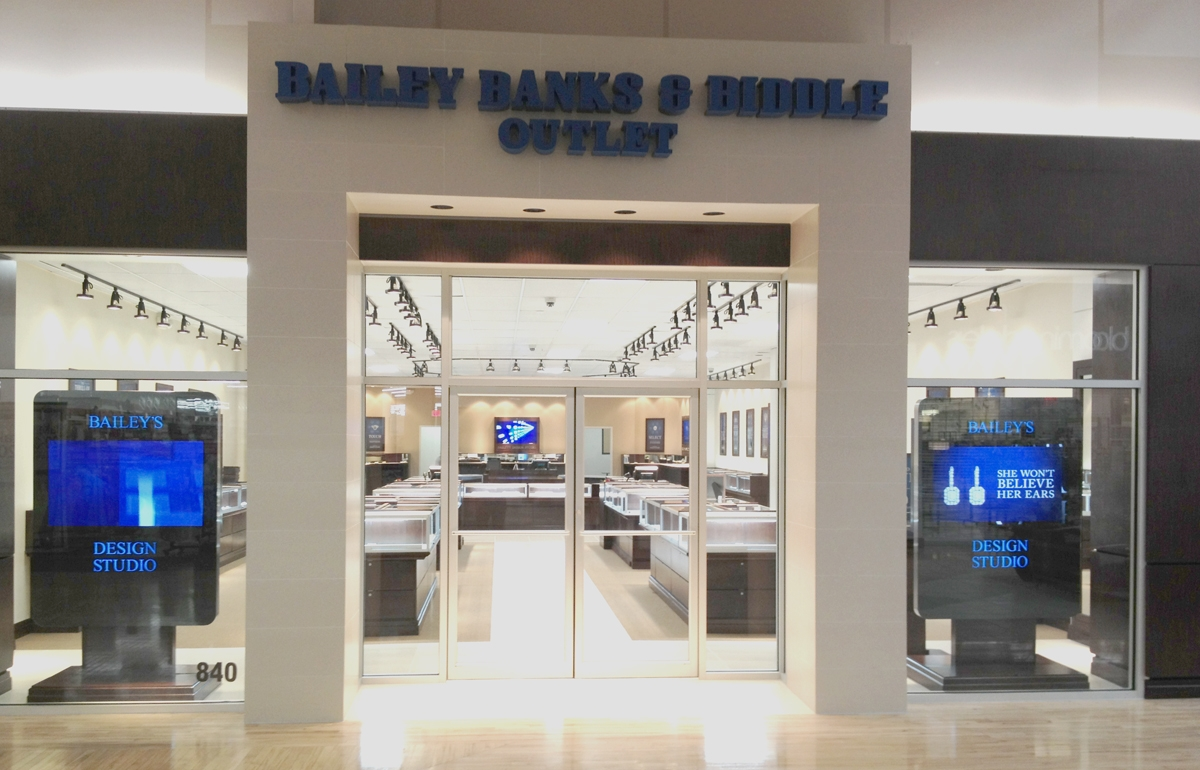
Potomac Mills outlet, one of the company's nine retail stores in 2012

In 1962, Bailey Banks & Biddle became a part of the Zale Corporation. Zale opened many Bailey Banks & Biddle stores in numerous cities. In 2007, Zale Corporation sold the 65-store jewelry chain to Finlay Enterprises. Finlay Enterprises filed for Chapter 11 bankruptcy in August 2009, and Bailey Banks & Biddle was relaunched as a private company by the new owners in the spring of 2010. The new owners bought the name and eight original locations. They did not honor guarantees on any items purchased prior to their ownership as all prior warranties were voided with the dissolution of Finlay Enterprises. The company utilizing the name Bailey Banks & Biddle declared bankruptcy in November 2019. At the time the company was reduced to one store located in Houston, Texas. The remaining inventory was seized for back taxes, interest and penalties and sold at auction in June 2020. The website for Bailey, Banks and Biddle leads to Finlay as of March 2023 with a copyright dated 2020.

=== Bailey Buildings ===
A building which once contained the Bailey Banks & Biddle flagship store and at which the company was flagship occupant exists as at 1218 Chestnut Street near Philadelphia City Hall. It is now a multi tenant corporate office building owned by the Thylan Associates. It backs onto the adjoining former factory building on Sansom Street.

The Bailey & Co. factory building stands at 1217 Sansom St., in Center City, Philadelphia. As of 2019, it has been renovated as the Biddle Building, an office building with a variety of creative and technical industry tenants.
