= California Film Commission =

California agency for media production

Agency overview
- Formed: 1985
- Headquarters: 7080 Hollywood Boulevard, Suite 900, Hollywood, California 90028
- Agency executives: Colleen Bell, Director; Thomas Davis, Board Chairman
- Parent agency: Governor's Office of Business and Economic Development - (GO-Biz)
- Website: http://www.film.ca.gov/

The California Film Commission (CFC) was founded in 1985 by then California Governor George Deukmejian to act in an economic development capacity for the state. It is a part of the California Trade and Commerce Agency, formerly the Business, Transportation, and Housing Agency. Its purpose is to enhance California's position as the location of choice for motion picture, television and commercial production.

The board is made up of 26 members, appointed by the governor, the Senate Committee on Rules, and the Speaker of the Assembly, as well as ex officio membership. The commission has two programs: Film California First and Star Program. The former, founded in 2000 by then Governor Gray Davis, refunds location costs to filmmakers for certain locations and expenses. The latter offers certain state owned properties for free to filmmakers. There are over 50 local film commissions known as FLICS (Film Locations in California, Statewide) associated with CFC that provide local support for filmmakers and facilitate with the permit process.

The current director of the California Film Commission is Colleen Bell. Previous directors included Amy Lemisch, Lisa Rawlins, and Karen Constine.

== Film & Television Tax Credit Program ==
The California Film Commission administers the Film & Television Tax Credit Program which provides tax credits based on qualified expenditures for eligible productions that are produced in California. 3.0 is the most recent iteration of the tax credit program. The program was first enacted in 2009 (“1.0”), and was renewed and expanded in 2014 (“2.0”) and 2018 (“3.0”).[N2] Program 3.0 allocated $330 million a year.[N2]

In October 2024, Governor Gavin Newsom proposed more than doubling the program’s annual allocation, from $330 million to $750 million.[N3] The expansion was enacted in 2025, and the fourth iteration of the program, known as Program 4.0, began on 1 July 2025.[N1][N4] Under Program 4.0, the credits became refundable for the first time, beginning with the 2025–26 fiscal year.[N5] In the first rounds of allocations under the expanded program, 52 film projects were awarded credits in October 2025, including ten films from major studios, with projected spending of $1.4 billion in the state.[N4] According to the state, the program generated more than $27 billion in economic activity and supported more than 211,000 cast and crew jobs between 2009 and 2025.[N4]

== Library ==
In 1993, NASA's Jet Propulsion Laboratory signed an agreement to develop an online reference system for the CFC's Location Resource Library. The Electronic Production Resource Library Information Database would be a catalog for the more than 200,000 location photographs that the CFC had at the time. The project, undertaken by Caltech who manages the JPL for NASA, and the California Trade and Commerce Agency, aims to assist with the screening process for potential production locations through the use of new technology.

The library is the world's largest of its kind, housing hundreds of thousands of images of California. The website CinemaScout helps production scouts review locations and plan a shoot. Subject categories include Towns and Communities; Residential; Commercial and Retail; Public/Government/Municipal; Educational and Religious; Industrial; Parks and Recreation Areas; Ranches, Farms and Agriculture; Transportation; Water and Coastal Area; and Geography/Geology.

== Awards ==
CFC and FLICS are hosts of the California On Location Awards which include the Location Professional of the Year Award and the Robin Eickman Memorial Mentorship Award.

At the 2009 Locations Trade Show, attended by 180 film commissions and others representing more than 30 countries, the CFC's pavilion received 2nd Prize for "Most Informative Booth".
