= Finlay Enterprises =

Finlay Enterprises Inc
- Industry: Jewelry
- Founded: 1887
- Defunct: 2010
- Fate: Bankruptcy
- Headquarters: New York, United States
- Number of locations: 781 locations in the United States

Finlay Enterprises Inc. was a holding company based in New York that conducted business through its wholly owned subsidiary "Finlay Fine Jewelry". It was founded in 1887. Finlay Enterprises Inc. filed for Chapter 11 bankruptcy in August, 2009.

Finlay operated the fine jewelry departments in many department stores. The department space was leased to Finlay. The number of locations Finlay operated at the end of the second quarter ended August 1, 2009 totaled 182, including 67 Bailey Banks & Biddle, 34 Carlyle and four Congress specialty jewelry stores and 77 licensed departments with The Bon-Ton.

Finlay operated in department store groups such as Macy's Inc. (Formerly Federated Department Stores), Bloomingdale's, Bon Ton Department Stores, Lord & Taylor, Dillard's, and Gottschalks. The company also owned and operated specialty stores such as Carlyle & Co, J.E. Caldwell & Co., and Park Promenade Jewellers.

== Acquisitions ==
Carlyle & Co. was acquired May 2005, adding 34 stores under the Carlyle & Co., J.E. Caldwell & Co., and Park Promenade banners. Congress was acquired December 2006.

Bailey Banks & Biddle was formerly owned by Zale Corporation. They competed with other high-end retailers such as Tiffany and independent jewelry stores. The name "Zell Bros" was used for one location. The stores tended to carry many high-end designer lines, including Scott Kay, Tacori, Ritani, Mikimoto, and David Yurman. Stores use the slogan "Where Treasures Live". There were 72 Bailey Banks and Biddle locations as of May 22, 2007. 15 Texas locations branded as "Corrigan's" and "Sweeney's" were transferred to the Bailey Banks & Biddle nameplate when Zale decided to make the chain national.

== Bankruptcy liquidation ==
In November 2008, Lord & Taylor announced that it was ceasing its contract with Finlay in order to place jewelry from Fortunoff, which was acquired by Lord & Taylor's parent company NRDC Equity Partners LLC, in its stores. Macy's later made an announcement saying it too was ceasing its contract with Finlay. Near the end of that Christmas season, financial media began speculating that Finlay would not be able to meet its obligations for the next fiscal year. Soon several ratings agencies downgraded Finlay's credit rating, which further restricted its ability to finance operations. In late February 2009, Finlay announced it was going to exit its department store business. In March 2009, Finlay attempted last minute negotiations with its two largest creditors. In a conference call with shareholders in March, Finlay's outside accounting firm raised doubts about the company's ability to go on. On August 5, 2009, Finlay Enterprises filed for Chapter 11 corporate bankruptcy.
