= Alfred Puhan =

American diplomat (1913–2005)

Alfred Puhan (March 7, 1913 – January 20, 2005) was an American diplomat and presidential adviser. Puhan acted as an advisor to Richard Nixon and Lyndon Johnson, and also served as the U.S. Ambassador to Hungary in the Nixon administration in 1969. He left the post in 1973.

Puhan was born in Germany and in the 1940s, would read messages in German over the Voice of America, eventually writing for the show. His career at the VOA spanned eleven years, where he rose to the position of program director. He had 900 employees under him. He almost went to work with Edward R. Murrow but decided on a job with the US Embassy in Vienna, Austria, where he assisted in the creation of the Austrian State Treaty of 1955. But his first job in radio was with the British Broadcasting Company.

== Biography ==
Puhan was born in Marienburg, Germany (now Malbork, Poland). His father had been raised in the U.S., but returned to Germany at the wishes of his widowed mother, and subsequently returned to the U. S. and brought with him his family. They arrived in the United States in 1925 and lived in Sandwich, Illinois. He was educated at Oberlin College, the University of Cincinnati and Columbia University. He married Fairfax Judd in 1938, with whom he had three children, Ursula, Fairfax and Frederic. They divorced in 1977. He subsequently married Jeanne Lamar and remained with her until his death.

He joined the United States Foreign Service in 1953. After serving in Vienna, he was Executive Director of the European Bureau at the United States Department of State. He then served as the Deputy Chief of Mission at the U. S. Embassy in Thailand, 1962-1964. Upon his return, he was named Head of the Office of German Affairs. He was named United States Ambassador to Hungary by president Richard Nixon where he served 1969-1973. During his posting, he helped arrange the release of Cardinal József Mindszenty, the Hungarian prelate who had taken refuge and was granted asylum in the chancery during the Hungarian Revolution of 1956. Fifteen years after entering the building, he was whisked away out of the country, with the public not allowed to witness his departure on September 28, 1971.
