= George B. Sharp =

Irish-American silversmith

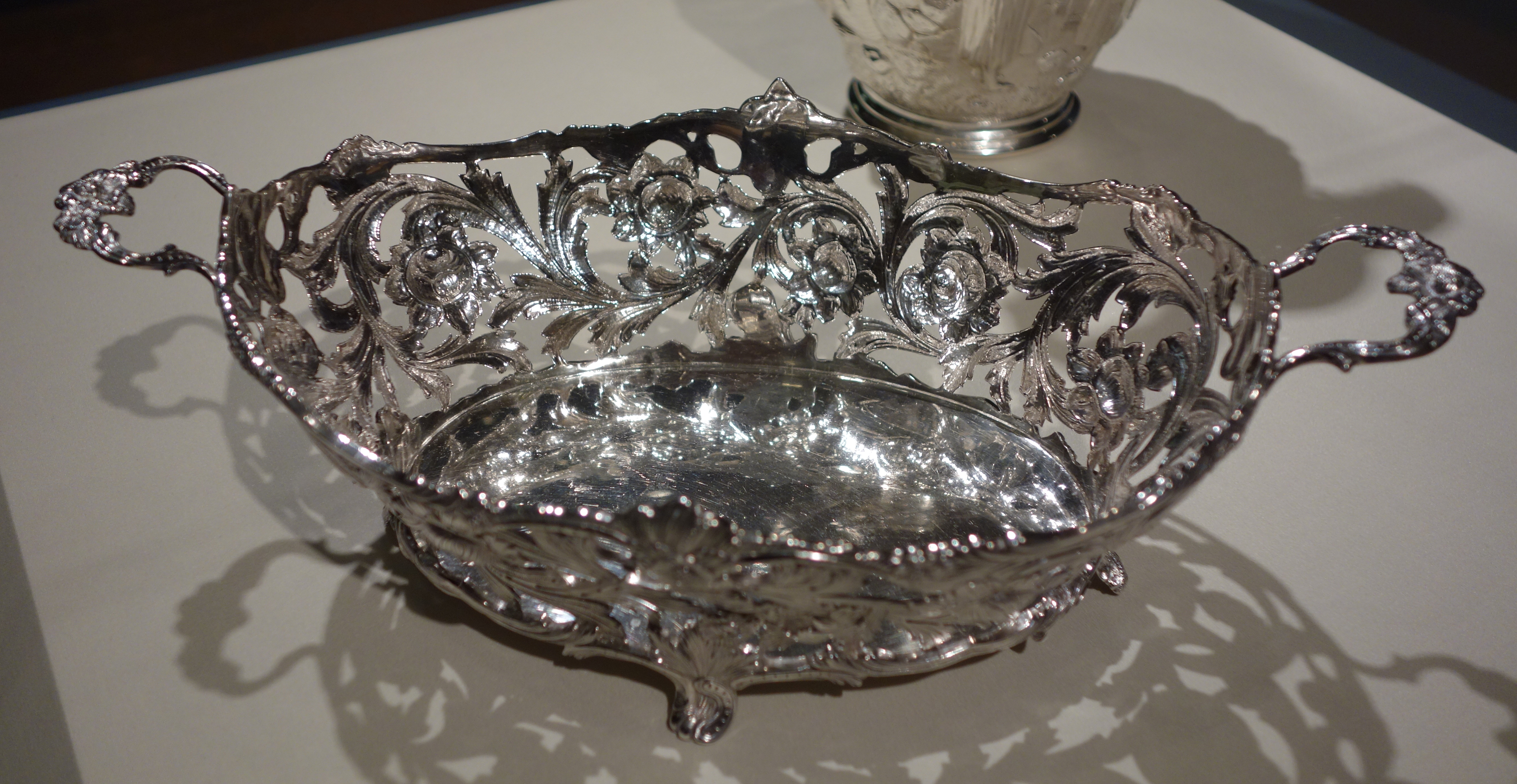
Basket by George B. Sharp, c. 1848-1850

George B. Sharp (c. 1819 – February 22, 1904) was an Irish-American silversmith, active in Philadelphia from about 1844-1874.

Sharp was born in Ireland in about 1819 and apprenticed in the United States. He is first listed in the 1850 Philadelphia directories with William Sharp, probably his brother, as a silver maker and a jewelry maker (generating $15,000 and $5,000 per year respectively). In 1852 or 1853, Sharp entered into the exclusive employment of the great Philadelphia retailers, Bailey & Co. He produced exclusively for Bailey until 1866, becoming "George Sharp (for Bailey & Co.)" after about 1862 when he started his own shop, and in 1866 resuming silverware manufacturing on his own. Sharp is noted for the high quality of his products, many of which were granted design patents, and also silverware designed by his employee Augustus Conradt. The Federal Industrial Census of 1870 reports a well-capitalized firm ($75,000) with an annual product of over $100,000 and forty-five employees. However, in 1874 the firm failed, a victim of the Panic of 1873. There are some indications that Sharp continued in business on a limited basis as a jeweler and silversmith until he retired around 1880. He died in Philadelphia.

His works are collected in the Dallas Museum of Art, Winterthur Museum, and Yale University Art Gallery.
