= Robert Granville Caldwell =

American historian, author and diplomat

- Caldwell pictured in 1918
- Born: 1898; Bogota, Colombia
- Died: 1976 (aged 77–78); Poughkeepsie, New York, United States
- Citizenship: United States
- Education: College of Wooster

Robert Granville Caldwell (1882–1976) was an American historian, author, and diplomat who served as Envoy Extraordinary and Minister Plenipotentiary of the United States to Portugal and to Bolivia, and held teaching posts at Rice University, MIT, and other institutions.

== Early life and education ==
Robert Granville Caldwell was born in Bogotá, Colombia to American parents. He studied at the College of Wooster, from which he graduated summa cum laude in 1904 and was elected to Phi Beta Kappa. After completing his undergraduate education, he worked for two years as an instructor at Forman Christian College in Punjab. He returned to the United States and completed his doctorate from Princeton University in 1918.

== Career ==
=== Academia ===
Caldwell began teaching before earning his doctorate, first at Huron College and then at his alma mater, the College of Wooster, where he lectured in economics. In 1914 he joined the faculty of the Rice Institute — now Rice University — teaching American History, a position he held for 19 years. After leaving Rice, he briefly taught at Columbia University and the University of Chicago.

=== Diplomatic service and later career ===
Caldwell was appointed the chief representative of the United States to Portugal, at the rank of Envoy Extraordinary and Minister Plenipotentiary, on June 13, 1933, presenting his credentials on August 21, 1933, and serving until May 28, 1937. He, thereafter, served in the same post in Bolivia from August 1937 to June 23, 1939.

Following his return to the United States, Caldwell accepted an appointment as dean of humanities at the Massachusetts Institute of Technology, a post he held until 1948. From 1948 to about 1952, he served as cultural attache at the United States embassy to Argentina and then spent four years in the same post at the United States embassy to Mexico.

=== Writing ===
Caldwell was the author of three books: The Lopez Expedition to Cuba (1915), A Short History of the American People (1927), and James A. Garfield — Party Chieftain (1931).

== Personal life ==
Caldwell was married and had three children. His son, Robert, served as a clandestine officer in the Central Intelligence Agency and his grandson through Robert, Duncan, is a paleontologist and artist.
