= George Sharp (footballer) =

English footballer (born 1935)

Personal information
- Full name: George Henry Sharp
- Date of birth: 20 July 1935
- Place of birth: Bedlington, England
- Position: Outside left

Senior career*
Years	Team	Apps	(Gls)
1957	Darlington	3	(0)
1957–1958	Oldham Athletic	1	(0)
- * Club domestic league appearances and goals

George Henry Sharp (born 20 July 1935) is an English former amateur footballer who played as an outside left in the Football League for Darlington and Oldham Athletic. He stood in for Tommy Moran in three Fourth Division matches early in Darlington's 1957–58 season; his debut, on 31 August 1957, was in a 5–0 defeat away to Scunthorpe United. He moved on to Oldham later that season, and appeared once in the League.

He was born in Bedlington, Northumberland.
