= Harry E. Bergold Jr. =

American diplomat (1931–1995)

Personal details
- Born: November 11, 1931 Olean, New York, U.S.
- Died: May 16, 1995 (aged 63) Paris, France
- Education: Yale University (BA, MA)
- Occupation: Diplomat

Military service
- Allegiance: United States
- Branch/service: United States Army

Harry E. Bergold, Jr. (November 11, 1931 – May 16, 1995) was an American diplomat. He was known for providing the information to journalists that led to the discovery that U.S. government funds were being illegally sent to anti-Sandinista fighters in Nicaragua.

Bergold was born in Olean, New York on November 11, 1931. He served as the U.S. Ambassador to Hungary and Nicaragua “before his career was cut short by conservatives in the Senate.” A year after he returned from Nicaragua, Ronald Reagan nominated him to be ambassador to Morocco. Senator Jesse Helms and several others felt “Bergold had not been sufficiently tough on the leftist contras during his tenure in Managua, objected to his nomination and defeated it.” He also provides vital information Oliver North and his supporters helped defeat his nomination. Bergold earned a Bachelor of Arts degree from Yale in 1953, served in the Army, and then returned to Yale to earn a Master of Arts degree in 1957. He died at his home in Paris on May 16, 1995, at the age of 63. He had been suffering from cancer.
