= Charles H. Thomas (diplomat) =

American diplomat (1934–1998)

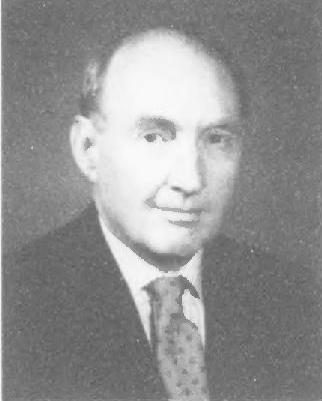

Personal details
- Born: June 23, 1934 Buffalo, New York, U.S.
- Died: September 13, 1998 (aged 64) New York City, New York, U.S.
- Education: Harvard University
- Occupation: Diplomat, helicopter pilot

Military service
- Allegiance: United States
- Branch: United States Navy
- Years of service: 1956–1959; 1959–1972 (Navy Reserve)
- Rank: Lieutenant commander

Charles H. Thomas (June 23, 1934 – September 13, 1998) was an American diplomat who served as ambassador to Hungary from 1990 to 1994, and as special U.S. envoy to the former Yugoslavia before his retirement in 1995. Thomas originally joined the Foreign Service in 1959.

Thomas was born in Buffalo, New York on June 23, 1934. He graduated from Harvard University before serving as a helicopter pilot in the Navy from 1956 to 1959. He then served in the Navy Reserve until 1972, retiring with the rank of lieutenant commander.

Thomas, a resident of Annapolis, Maryland, traveled to Manhattan for experimental medical treatment at Memorial Sloan Kettering Cancer Center for leukemia. He died there on September 13, 1998, at the age of 64.
