= Villard (surname) =

Villard is a surname of French origin. It may refer to:

- Énora Villard (born 1993), French squash player
- Fanny Garrison Villard (1844–1928), American suffragist, pacifist, and NAACP co-founder; wife of Henry Villard
- Feliks Villard (1908–?), Estonian chess player
- Henry Villard (1835–1900), Bavarian German-born American journalist and railroad tycoon; husband of Fanny Villard
- Henry Serrano Villard (1900–1996), American foreign service officer, ambassador, and author; grandson of Henry and Fanny Villard
- Léonie Villard (1890–1962), French literary critic, academic, and diarist
- Nina Villard (1843-1884), French composer, writer and salon hostess
- Oswald Garrison Villard (1872–1949), American journalist; son of Henry and Fanny Villard
- Oswald Garrison Villard Jr. (1916–2004), American academic and electrical engineer; grandson of Henry and Fanny Villard
- Paul Ulrich Villard (1860–1934), French chemist and physicist; discovered gamma rays
- Philippe Langenieux-Villard (born 1955), French politician
- Sylvia del Villard (1928–1990), Puerto Rican actress, dancer, and choreographer
- Tom Villard (1953–1994), American actor
- Ugo Monneret de Villard (1881–1954), Italian archeologist and art historian
- Villard de Honnecourt (fl. 13th century), French artist

== See also ==
- Vilard (disambiguation)
- Villar (surname)
- Villari (surname)
