= Mariquita Platov =

American writer (1905-2000)

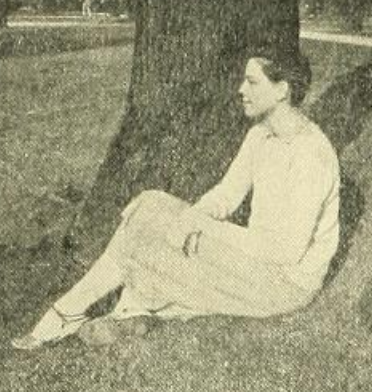
- Mariquita Villard (later Platov), from the 1927 yearbook of Bryn Mawr College
- Born: Mariquita Serrano Villard; June 5, 1905; New York City, U.S.
- Died: December 14, 2000 (aged 95); Philmont, New York, U.S.
- Education: Brearley School
- Alma mater: Bryn Mawr College
- Occupations: Writer; artist; pacifist
- Relatives: William Lloyd Garrison (great-grandfather); Mary J. Serrano (grandmother); Fanny Garrison Villard (grandmother); Oswald Garrison Villard (uncle); Vincent Serrano (uncle); Henry Serrano Villard (brother); Fred Keating (first cousin); Oswald Garrison Villard Jr. (first cousin)

Mariquita Serrano Villard Platov (June 5, 1905 – December 14, 2000) was an American writer, artist, educator, and pacifist, and a co-founder of the Orthodox Peace Fellowship.

== Early life and education ==
Mariquita Serrano Villard was born in New York City, the daughter of railroad executive Harold Garrison Villard and Mariquita Serrano Villard, and the younger sister of ambassador Henry Serrano Villard. Her mother was born in Costa Rica. Her paternal grandmother was suffragist Fanny Garrison Villard, and her great-grandfather was abolitionist William Lloyd Garrison. Her maternal grandmother was Irish-born translator Mary J. Serrano. Her uncles included actor Vincent Serrano and editor Oswald Garrison Villard. She graduated from the Brearley School, and from Bryn Mawr College in 1927.

== Career ==
After college and a broken marriage engagement, Villard traveled in Europe with her mother, and was moved by the plight of Russian Orthodox Christians in Stalin's Soviet Union. In the 1930s, she became an Orthodox Christian. She taught school in New Jersey and in Boston in the 1950s. She was poetry editor of an Orthodox children's magazine. She joined the Fellowship of Reconciliation in 1962, and co-founded the Orthodox Peace Fellowship in the mid-1960s. In 1969, she was part of a small group of protesters held for questioning after they tried to distribute leaflets at West Point. In 1973 she was surprised to be mentioned in connection with Richard Nixon's "enemies list", saying "I don't have an enemy in the world. Even Mr. Nixon is not an enemy of mine."

Platov studied Buddhism with Sokei-an at the Buddhist Society of America. She was a founding member of the Buddhist Peace Fellowship in 1979. In her later years she exhibited her prints and lithographs, and gave poetry readings in the Catskills. She also placed anti-war advertisements in the local newspaper.

Platov identified as a Christian Buddhist, and cited both Gandhi and Carl Jung as influences on her philosophy and her writings.

In 1976, her musical play The Light of the Octave premiered at the Sonora Music Festival at Lexington House in Lexington, NY, with a cast that included Judith Martin, Mark Groubert, Julius Eastman and Jani Brenn. A year later, in June 1977, her play Who Invented Zero? was read at Sonora House in Haines Falls, NY, and on August 8, 1977, Lazarus' Cue premiered at Lexington Conservatory Theatre. The production was directed by Mary Hall with actors Steven Rotblatt, Kristin Joliff, Mary Baird, and Sands Hall.

== Publications ==
- "Forest Song" (1935, poem)
- "To a Baby" (1960, poem)
- The Christmas Candle (1962, songs)
- Tease the Tiger's Nose (1965, poetry, illustrated by Dorothy Varian)
- "Morris Milgram and his Mission: A true saga in dramatic form of a working venture in open cooperative housing" (1968, article)
- One Moment: An Easter Meditation; Thirty-six Sonnet Variation on a Paschal Theme (1971, poems)
- "Peacemaking Challenge of Today" (1973, article)
- Parable and Number: Essays and Poems (1973)
- From the Herb Garden of a Christian Buddhist (1973, poetry)
- "Some Thoughts Concerning Mary" (1974, article)
- "Simplicity Begins with Unity" (1974, article)
- "17 Sonnets" (1975, Tideline Press)
- Keep it Dark: A Christmas Legend (1977, a play)
- Eight Plays of Peace Creativity (plays)
- Seventeen Sonnets (poems)
- "Haitian Boat People Need U.S. Asylum" (1979, article)
- "Whispering Clouds" (1979, poem)
- Lazarus' Cue and Other One-Act Plays (1980)
- "Father Is Leaving" (1981, play)

== Personal life ==
Platov, known as "Quita" to her friends, was engaged to marry Louis Warren Hill Jr., grandson of financier James J. Hill, in 1927, but they broke their engagement in 1928. She married Henry Boris Platov in 1937; they divorced in 1950. In 1962, she moved to a cabin on the mountaintop in East Jewett, where she lived "a hermit's life". She died in 2000, at the age of 95, in Philmont, New York.
