= Elizabeth Thomas =

Elizabeth Thomas may refer to:

- Elizabeth Thomas (poet, born 1675) (1675–1731), British poet
- Elizabeth Frances Amherst (poet) (later Thomas; 1716–1779), British poet
- Elizabeth Thomas (poet/novelist) (1771–1855), British novelist and poet
- Elizabeth Caruthers (died 1857), American pioneer settler who sometimes identified as Elizabeth Thomas
- Elizebeth Thomas Werlein (1883–1946), born Elizebeth Thomas, New Orleans conservationist
- Bess Thomas (1892–1968), Australian librarian
- Elizabeth Thomas (Egyptologist) (1907–1986), American Egyptologist
- Elizabeth Marshall Thomas (born 1931), American anthropologist and author
- Betty Thomas (born 1948), American actress
- Betsy Thomas (born 1966), American television writer
- Liz Thomas (born 1987), American hiker

== See also ==
- Liz Thomas (scientist), British climate scientist
