= Fanny Garrison Villard =

American suffragist (1844–1928)

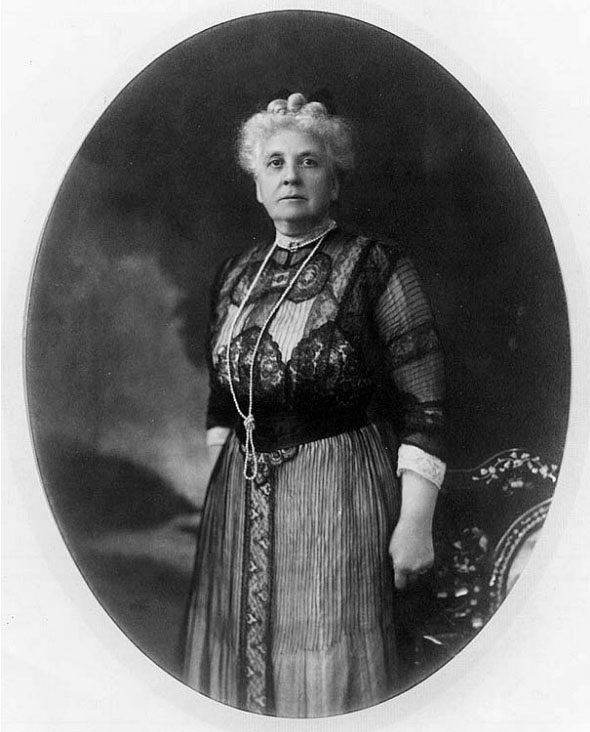
- Fanny Garrison Villard c. 1910
- Born: Helen Frances Garrison; December 16, 1844; Boston, Massachusetts, U.S.
- Died: July 5, 1928 (aged 83); Dobbs Ferry, New York, U.S.
- Spouse: Henry Villard (m. 1866; died 1900)
- Children: Oswald Garrison Villard
- Parent(s): William Lloyd Garrison; Helen Eliza Benson
- Relatives: Wendell Phillips Garrison (brother); Henry Serrano Villard (grandson); Oswald G. Villard Jr. (grandson); Mariquita Platov (granddaughter)

Helen Frances “Fanny” Garrison Villard (December 16, 1844 – July 5, 1928) was an American women's suffrage campaigner, pacifist and a co-founder of National Association for the Advancement of Colored People. She was the daughter of prominent publisher and abolitionist William Lloyd Garrison and the wife of railroad tycoon Henry Villard.

== Early life ==
Helen Frances Garrison, known to family and friends as "Fanny," was born on December 16, 1844. She was the only surviving daughter of five sons and two daughters (of whom a son and a daughter died as children) born to Helen Eliza Benson (1811–1876) and William Lloyd Garrison (1805–1879). Her brother, William Lloyd Garrison Jr. (1838–1909), was a prominent advocate of the single tax, free trade, women's suffrage, and of the repeal of the Chinese Exclusion Act. Another brother, Wendell Phillips Garrison (1840–1907), was literary editor of The Nation from 1865 to 1906. Her other two brothers were George Thompson Garrison and Francis Jackson Garrison, who wrote a biography of their father and was named after abolitionist Francis Jackson.

== Activism ==
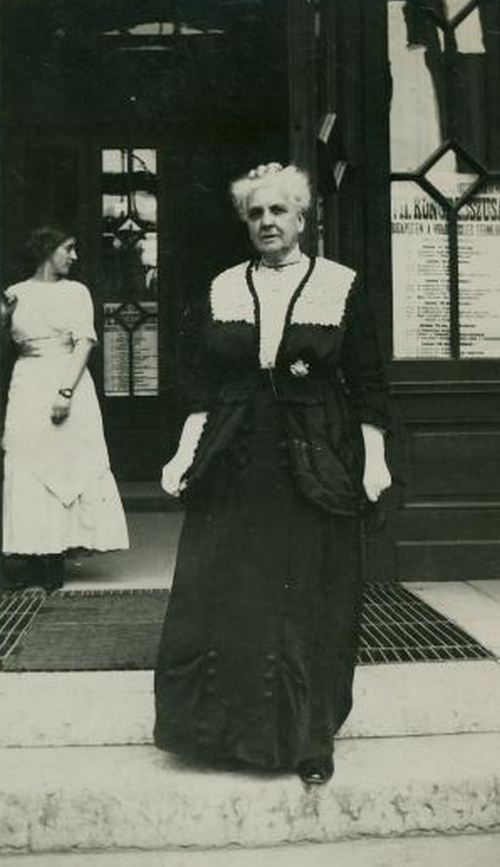
Fanny Garrison Villard at the International Woman Suffrage Congress, Budapest, 1913.

While raising her children, she led a life fairly typical life of a woman in a traditional upper-class marriage. After her children were grown and her husband died in 1900, Fanny Garrison Villard became more active in peace groups and women's rights. She joined the American Woman Suffrage Association along with Anna Shaw and Carrie Chapman Catt.

In 1914, she marched against the First World War in New York City. After the winning of suffrage, she founded the Women's Peace Society on September 12, 1919. She was a delegate to The Hague in 1907, and in 1921 a fraternal delegate to the conference of the Women's International League for Peace and Freedom.

Along with her son Oswald Garrison Villard, she was co-founder of National Association for the Advancement of Colored People.

== Personal life ==
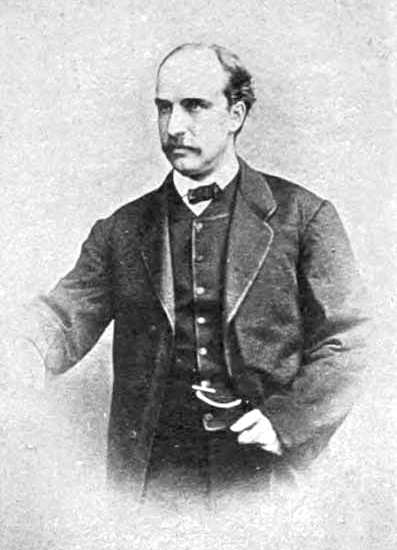
Her husband, Henry Villard, in 1866, the year they married.

In January 1866, she married Henry Villard (1835–1900) whom she had met during the Civil War when he was a war correspondent. He later became the President of the Northern Pacific Railway. Together, they were the parents of:

- Helen Elise Villard (1868–1917), who married Dr. James William Bell, an English physician, in 1897, and was a semi-invalid most of her life due to a childhood fall down an elevator shaft at the Westmoreland House.
- Harold Garrison Villard (1869–1952), who married Mariquita Serrano (1864–1936), sister of Vincent Serrano and daughter of Mary J. Serrano, in 1897.
- Oswald Garrison Villard (1872–1949), who married Julia Breckenridge Sanford (1876–1962)
- Henry Hilgard Villard (1883–1890), who died young.

Fanny Garrison Villard died on July 5, 1928, aged 83, at her home, Thorwood Park, in Dobbs Ferry, New York.

=== Descendants ===
Through her son Harold, she was the grandmother of Henry Serrano Villard (1900–1996), the foreign service officer and ambassador, and Vincent Serrano Villard, and Mariquita Villard Platov.

Through her son Oswald, she was the grandmother of Dorothea Marshall Villard Hammond (1907–1994), a member of the American University in Cairo, Henry Hilgard Villard (1911–1983), the head of the economics department at the City College of New York and the first male president of Planned Parenthood of New York City, and Oswald Garrison Villard Jr. (1916–2004), a professor of electrical engineering at Stanford University.

=== Residences ===
In the late 1870s, the Villards bought an old country estate known as "Thorwood Park" in Dobbs Ferry, New York. The home, which featured sweeping views of the Hudson River, was redecorated by Charles Follen McKim of McKim, Mead and White in the early 1880s to Fanny's specifications.

In 1884, the Villards hired Joseph M. Wells of the architecture firm McKim, Mead and White to design and construct the Villard Houses, which appear as one building but in fact is six separate residences. The houses are located at 455 Madison Avenue between 50th and 51st Street in Manhattan, with four of the homes opening onto the courtyard facing Madison, while the other two had entrances on 51st Street. The homes are in the Romanesque Revival style with neo-Renaissance touches and features elaborate interiors by prominent artists including John La Farge, Augustus Saint-Gaudens, and Maitland Armstrong.

After the Villards' bankruptcy, Villard House was purchased by Elisabeth Mills Reid (1857–1931), wife of Whitelaw Reid, a diplomat and the editor of the New York Tribune, and the daughter of Darius Ogden Mills and the sister of Ogden Mills, bankers and financiers.

== See also ==
- Woman's Peace Party
