= Villari (surname) =

Villari is a surname. It may refer to:

- Emilio Villari (1836–1904), Italian physicist
- Dan Villari (born 2002), American football player
- Libby Villari (born 1951), American actor
- Linda White Mazini Villari (1836–1915), British author and translator
- Luigi Villari (1876–1959), Italian historian, diplomat, journalist, and traveloguer
- Pasquale Villari (1827–1917), Italian historian and politician

== See also ==
- Vilard (disambiguation)
- Vilardi (surname), a similarly spelled surname
- Villar (surname), a similarly spelled surname
- Villard (surname), a similarly spelled surname
- Villari (company), an Italian porcelain workshop
