= Mary J. Serrano =

Writer, poet and translators

Mary Jane Christie Serrano
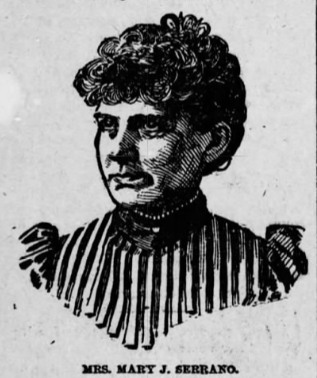
- Born: Mary Jane Christie c. 1840; Castlebar, Ireland
- Died: 1923; New York City, US
- Occupations: Translator and writer
- Writing career
- Pen name: Mary J. Serrano

Mary Jane Christie Serrano (c. 1840–1923) was a writer, poet and considered one of the best known translators in the United States.

== Life ==
Serrano was born Mary Jane Christie in Castlebar, Ireland, c. 1840 to Thomas Christie and Jane Bourns. She married Spaniard Juan Emigdio Serrano and emigrated to South America with him. There, he was a minister in the government and brother of the President of Colombia, José María Campo Serrano as well a relative of Carlos Holguin. She lived there for many years, also spending significant time in New York City as a result of his work. She learned to speak fluent Spanish. As a result of her proficiency, when her husband died she began to translate works into English. She also translated from French and Portuguese. Her first translation was of Juan Valera whom she met in Washington D.C. while he was minister to the United States from Spain.

The family were considered socialites due to their connections to the Spanish royal family and other government representatives. Serrano was considered a well known authority on Spanish literature and was appointed Judge of awards in the Spanish Literary and Educations Departments of the Columbian Exposition by the Spanish Government.

== Personal life ==
Because of her husband's family and work the Serrano's were well connected. In 1894, Serrano took her daughter to Europe, visiting Spain where both were received by the Queen Regent returned with delightful recollections of the young king and princesses. Serrano had three children with her husband:

- Mariguita Serrano Villard, (1864–1936) whose mother-in-law was the activist Fanny Garrison Villard, co-founder of the NAACP. Her son was writer and diplomat Henry Serrano Villard; her daughter was Mariquita Platov, a writer and pacifist
- Camilla Serrano Keating, (–1920), mother of magician Fred Keating
- Vincent Serrano, (1866–1935) stage and film star.

Serrano died in her home in New York on 1 July 1923.

== Selected works ==
- Mrs. Mary Jane Christie Serrano (1910). Asphodel. Knickerbocker.
- Mary Jane Christie Serrano (1883). Destiny: And Other Poems. G.P. Putnam's Sons.
- Alarcón, P. Antonio de (1892). The child of the ball. Translated by Mary J. Serrano. New York: Cassell Pub. Co.
- Emile Zola (3 December 2017). Doctor Pascal. Translated by Mary J. Serrano. BoD – Books on Demand. pp. 3–. ISBN 978-3-7326-1769-2.
- Pérez Benito Galdós (1895). Dona Perfecta (Dodo Press). Translated by Mary J. Serrano. New York: New York, Harper & brothers. ISBN 9781406517149.
- Marie Bashkirtseff (1891). Letters Translated by Mary J. Serrano. Cassell Publishing Company.
- Marie Bashkirtseff (1889). Marie Bashkirtseff: The Journal of a Young Artist, 1860-1884. Translated by Mary J. Serrano. Cassell Publishing Company. pp. 9–.
- Emilia Pardo Bazán (condesa de); Mary Jane SERRANO (1891). Morriña (Homesickness) ... Translated by Mary J. Serrano. Cassell Publishing Company.
- Eca De Queiros; Mary Jane Christie Serrano (1889). Dragon's Teeth: A Novel from the Portuguese. Creative Media Partners, LLC. ISBN 9781375538435.
- Pedro Antonio de Alarcón (1891). Moors and Christians, and Other Tales. From the Spanish ... by Mary J. Serrano. New York.
- Juan Valera (1891). Pepita Ximenez. Translated by Mary J. Serrano. Appleton.
- Emilia Pardo Bazán (1891). The Swan of Vilamorta. Translated by Mary J. Serrano. New York: Cassell Publishing Co. ISBN 9783741890109.
