= Vilardi (surname) =

Vilardi is an Italian surname. Notable people with the surname include:

- Emma May Vilardi (1922–1990), American author and adoption reunion advocate
- Gabriel Vilardi (born 1999), Canadian ice hockey player
- Pepê (footballer, born 1998) (real name João Pedro Vilardi Pinto), Brazilian footballer
- Jay Vilardi, American guitarist

== See also ==
- Vilard (disambiguation)
- Villard (surname), a similarly spelled surname
- Villari (surname), a similarly spelled surname
