= Eugene McAuliffe =

Eugene McAuliffe may refer to:

- Gene McAuliffe, American baseball player
- Eugene V. McAuliffe, American diplomat
