= Villar (surname) =

Villar is a Spanish surname. Notable people with the surname include:

- Adrián Villar Rojas (born 1980), Argentine sculptor
- Alberto Villar (died 1974), Argentine police chief and co-founder of Argentine Anticommunist Alliance
- Amarilis Villar (born 1984), Venezuelan volleyball player
- Amine Villar (born 2006), French-Moroccan singer-songwriter
- Ángel Villar (born 1949), Spanish sprint canoer
- Ángel María Villar (born 1950), Spanish footballer
- Antonio Villaraigosa (born Antonio Villar) (born 1953), former mayor of Los Angeles
- Buboy Villar (born 1999), Filipino actor
- Camille Villar (born 1985), Filipino television host, businesswoman and politician
- Cynthia Villar (born 1950), Filipino businesswoman and politician
- César Martín Villar (born 1977), Spanish footballer
- David Villar (born 1997), American baseball player for the San Francisco Giants
- Diego Villar (born 1981), Argentine footballer
- Diego Mariño Villar (born 1990), Spanish footballer
- Elliot Villar (born 1980), American actor
- Federico Villar (born 1985), Argentine footballer
- Federico Villar (born 1963), Filipino and Government official
- Felipe Mena Villar, Chilean agricultural engineer
- Gabriel Villar (1748–1826), Spanish clergyman and politician
- Germán Villar (born 1975), Spanish opera singer
- Gonzalo Villar (poet) (born 1968), Chilean poet
- Henry Villar (born 1987), Dominican Republic baseball player
- Jesús Blanco Villar (born 1963), Spanish cyclist
- Jonathan Villar (born 1991), Dominican baseball player
- Juan Villar (born 1988), Spanish footballer
- Justo Villar (born 1977), Paraguayan footballer
- León Villar (born 1969), Spanish judoka
- Leonardo Villar (1923–2020), Brazilian actor
- Luis Villar (born 1967), Argentine basketball player
- Luis Villar Borda (1929–2008), Colombian politician and jurist
- Manny Villar (born 1949), Filipino businessman and politician
- Mark Villar (born 1978), Filipino businessman and politician
- Paulo Villar (born 1978), Colombian hurdler
- Ricardo Villar (Argentine footballer) (born 1989), Argentine footballer
- Ricardo Villar (Brazilian footballer) (born 1979), Brazilian footballer
- Rolo Villar, Argentine radio host
- Rusmeris Villar (born 1983), Colombian weightlifter
- Samanta Villar (born 1975), Spanish journalist
- Sergio Villar (born 1944), Uruguayan footballer
- Wilmar Villar Mendoza (born c. 1980), Cuban dissident

== See also ==
- Vilar (surname), a similarly spelled surname
- Villard (surname), a similarly spelled surname
- Villari (surname), a similarly spelled surname
