= Philip Mayer Kaiser =

American diplomat (1913–2007)

United States Ambassador to Austria
- In office February 19, 1980 – March 2, 1981
- President: Jimmy Carter
- Preceded by: Milton A. Wolf
- Succeeded by: Theodore E. Cummings

United States Ambassador to Hungary
- In office July 7, 1977 – March 9, 1980
- President: Jimmy Carter
- Preceded by: Eugene V. McAuliffe
- Succeeded by: Harry E. Bergold, Jr.

United States Ambassador to Senegal
- In office August 1, 1961 – May 18, 1964
- President: John F. Kennedy; Lyndon B. Johnson
- Preceded by: Henry S. Villard
- Succeeded by: William L. Eagleton

United States Ambassador to Mauritania
- In office August 1, 1961 – May 18, 1964
- President: John F. Kennedy; Lyndon B. Johnson
- Preceded by: Henry S. Villard
- Succeeded by: William L. Eagleton

Personal details
- Born: July 12, 1913 New York City, New York, United States
- Died: May 24, 2007 (aged 93) Sibley Memorial Hospital, Washington, D.C., United States
- Party: Democratic Party
- Occupation: Diplomat

Philip Mayer Kaiser (July 12, 1913 – May 24, 2007) was an American diplomat.

== Education ==
Born in New York City, Kaiser graduated from the University of Wisconsin–Madison in 1935. He was also a Rhodes Scholar in 1936 at Balliol College, Oxford. During this time, he studied labor history.

== Family ==
Philip was the second youngest of ten children. His father, Moishe Bear, emigrated from what is now Ukraine with his mother, Tema. The family lived in Bensonhurst, Brooklyn. On June 16, 1939, Philip Kaiser married Hannah Greeley. They had three sons: Robert, David, and Charles.

== Government service ==
Kaiser served in the United States Department of Labor as Assistant Secretary of Labor for International Affairs, during the administration of President Harry S. Truman. He was a special assistant to Governor Averell Harriman of New York from 1955 to 1959.

Later during the administration of President John F. Kennedy, Kaiser was ambassador to Senegal and Mauritania. During the Cuban Missile Crisis, he persuaded the President of Senegal, Léopold Sédar Senghor, to deny the Soviet Union landing rights to refuel its planes. From 1964 to 1969, he was the American Minister to the Court of St. James, or DCM of the American Embassy in London, when David K. E. Bruce was the American Ambassador there. Many of the leading British political figures of the period, including Ted Heath and Roy Jenkins, had been Kaiser's friends when he studied Politics, Philosophy and Economics at Balliol College, Oxford, from 1936 to 1939. While he was Minister, he entertained Groucho Marx, Robert F. Kennedy, and Richard Nixon, among many other famous cultural and political figures. He lived at Wychwood House, his official American residence on Cottesmore Gardens in Kensington.

Finally, during the administration of Jimmy Carter, Philip Kaiser served as ambassador to Hungary. While ambassador to Hungary, Philip Kaiser was instrumental in the return of the Crown of St. Stephen to the Hungarian government from the United States in 1978. After serving as ambassador to Austria, Philip Kaiser retired from government service in 1981. In 2000, Kaiser was one of three alumni of the Truman Administration who persuaded Congress to pass a law that changed the name of the headquarters of the State Department to the Harry S. Truman building. Of the four Democratic presidents Kaiser worked for, Truman was his favorite, because he was "the closest to a normal human being."

== Published works ==
- Kaiser, Philip, Journeying Far and Wide—A Political and Diplomatic Memoir, (1993).

== Notes ==
Diplomatic posts
| Preceded by Henry S. Villard | United States Ambassador to Senegal; 1961–1964 | Succeeded by William L. Eagleton |
| Preceded by Eugene V. McAuliffe | U.S. Ambassador to Hungary; 1977–1980 | Succeeded by Harry E. Bergold, Jr. |
| Preceded by Milton A. Wolf | U.S. Ambassador to Austria; 1980–1981 | Succeeded by Theodore E. Cummings |
