= Convoy (1927 film) =

1927 film by Lothar Mendes

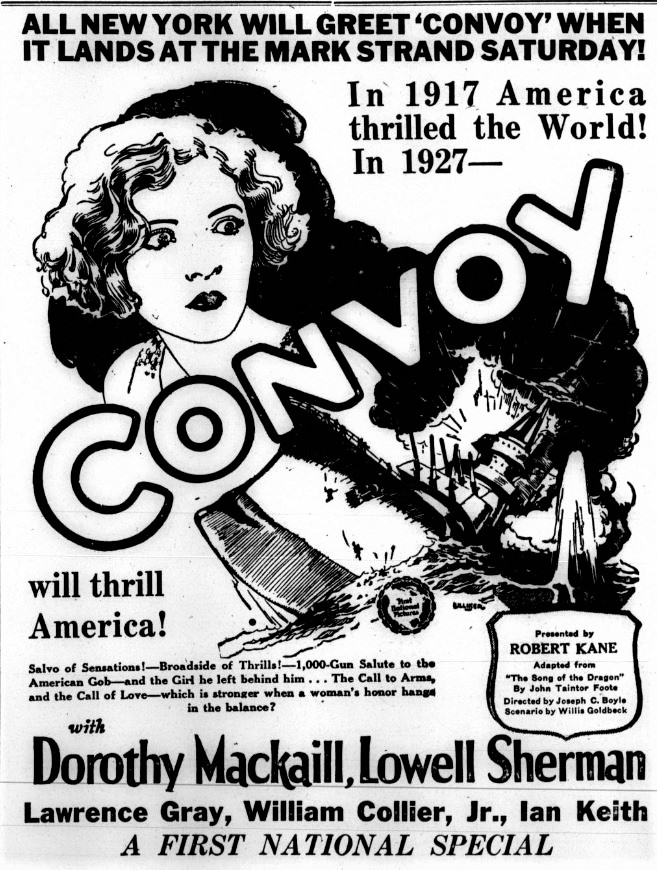
- Advertisement
- Directed by: Joseph C. Boyle; Lothar Mendes (uncredited)
- Written by: Willis Goldbeck (scenario)
- Based on: The Song of the Dragon by John Taintor Foote
- Produced by: Robert Kane; Victor Halperin; Edward Halperin
- Starring: Lowell Sherman; Dorothy Mackaill
- Cinematography: Ernest Haller
- Distributed by: First National Pictures
- Release date: April 24, 1927
- Running time: 8 reels (7,724 feet)
- Country: United States
- Language: Silent (English intertitles)

Convoy is a 1927 American silent World War I drama film directed by Joseph C. Boyle and Lothar Mendes, starring Lowell Sherman and Dorothy Mackaill, and released through First National Pictures. The film is an early producing credit for the Halperin Brothers, Victor and Edward, later of White Zombie fame, and is the final screen appearance of Broadway stars Gail Kane and Vincent Serrano.

The Alfred Hitchcock film Notorious (1946) was based on the same story, originally published in The Saturday Evening Post.

== Background ==
The Song of the Dragon, is a story by John Taintor Foote, which appeared as a two-part serial in The Saturday Evening Post in November 1921. Set during World War I in New York City, The film tells the tale of a theatrical producer approached by federal agents who want his assistance in recruiting an actress he once had a relationship with to seduce the leader of a gang of enemy saboteurs.

== Cast ==
- Lowell Sherman as Ernest Drake
- Dorothy Mackaill as Sylvia Dodge
- William Collier Jr. as John Dodge
- Lawrence Gray as Eugene Weyeth
- Ian Keith as Smith
- Gail Kane as Mrs. Weyeth
- Vincent Serrano as Mr. Dodge
- Donald Reed as Smith's Assistant
- Eddie Gribbon as Eddie
- Jack Ackroyd as Jack
- Ione Holmes as Ione

== Preservation ==
With no prints of Convoy located in any film archives, it is a lost film.
