= Vilard =

Vilard is both a surname and a given name. Notable people with the name include:

== Surname ==
- Bernadette Vilard (a.k.a. Moidele Bickel; 1937–2016), German costume designer
- Eddy Vilard (born 1988), Mexican actor and model
- Hervé Vilard (born 1946), French composer, singer, and stage performer

== Given name ==
- Vilard Normcharoen (1962–2014), Thai beach soccer player

== See also ==
- Vilar (surname), a similarly spelled surname
- Vilardi (surname), a similarly spelled surname
- Villard (surname), a similarly spelled surname
