= Henry Villard =

American journalist and financier (1835–1900)

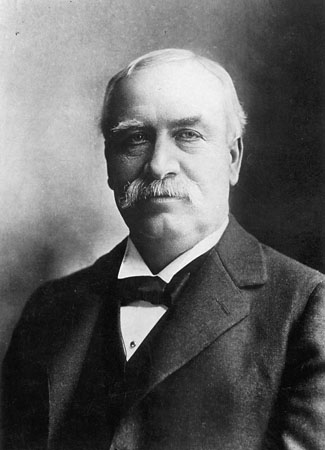

President of Northern Pacific Railway
- In office 1881–1884
- Preceded by: Frederick H. Billings
- Succeeded by: Robert Harris

Personal details
- Born: Ferdinand Heinrich Gustav Hilgard; April 10, 1835 Speyer, Rhenish Bavaria
- Died: November 12, 1900 (aged 65) Dobbs Ferry, New York
- Spouse: Helen Frances Garrison (m. 1866)
- Relations: Henry Villard (grandson); Oswald Villard Jr. (grandson)
- Children: 4, including Oswald
- Parent(s): Gustav Leonhard Hilgard; Katharina Antonia Elisabeth Von Pfeiffer
- Known for: Owned New York Evening Post and The Nation
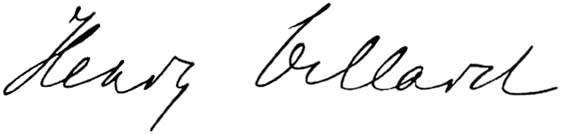
- Signature

Henry Villard (April 10, 1835 – November 12, 1900) was a German-American journalist and financier who was an influential leader and the sixth president of the Northern Pacific Railway (1881–1884) which completed its trans-continental route during his tenure in 1883.

Born and raised by Ferdinand Heinrich Gustav Hilgard in the historic ancient Roman Empire border fortification, then Medieval / Middle Ages town of Speyer, along the Rhine River in the Rhenish Palatinate of the Kingdom of Bavaria. Villard clashed with his more conservative father over politics and was sent to a semi-military academy across the border in northeastern France. As a teenager, he emigrated to the United States in the 1850s without his parents' knowledge. He changed his name to Henry Villard, the name of a French classmate, to avoid being sent back to Europe, and began making his way west, briefly studying law as he developed a career in journalism. He supported famed Western explorer ("The Pathfinder") and military officer in the United States Army of John C. Frémont (1813–1890), of the newly established Republican Party in his first presidential candidate campaign representing the new political party in the 1856 presidential election, and four years later followed former U.S. Representative (congressman) from Springfield, Illinois of Abraham Lincoln (1809–1865), in his bid for the American Presidency in the 1860 presidential election campaign.

Villard became a war correspondent, first covering the ensuing American Civil War (1861–1865), and later being sent back overseas by the Chicago Tribune to Europe (because of his childhood experiences and knowledge of foreign languages) to also cover the brief Austro-Prussian War in 1866, between two German-speaking totalitarian / authoritarian regimes fighting for political supremacy in Central Europe. It was also significant because with the quick decisive Prussian military victory over the neighboring Austrian Empire enabled the rising Kingdom of Prussia under dynamic Chancellor Otto von Bismarck (1815–1898, served Prussia 1862–1871 / Imperial Germany 1871–1890), to exclude Austria and its ruling Habsburg imperial dynasty from future German affairs and to then lead and dominate the unification campaign to create a new centralized German Empire in Central Europe. This occurred four years later in Paris after a similar defeat of rival Emperor Napoleon III of the Second French Empire and his French Army military forces of France in the subsequent Franco-Prussian War of 1870–1871.

He became a pacifist as a result of his experiences covering the two conflicts at home and abroad of the Civil War and European wars In the late 1860s. He married women's suffrage advocate Helen Frances Garrison (nicknamed "Fanny") and the daughter of famed newspaper publisher and slavery abolitionist William Lloyd Garrison (1805–1879), and returned to the U.S., only to go back to Germany several years later for his health in 1870.

While in Germany, Villard became involved in investments in American railroads, and returned to the U.S. in 1874 to oversee German investments in the Oregon and California Railroad. He visited Oregon that summer, and being impressed with the region's natural resources, began acquiring various transportation interests in the region. During the ensuing decade he acquired several rail and steamship companies, and pursued a rail line from Portland to the Pacific Ocean; he was successful, but the line cost more than anticipated, causing financial turmoil. Villard returned to Europe, helping German investors acquire stakes in the transportation network, and returned to New York in 1886.

Also in the 1880s, Villard acquired the New York Evening Post and The Nation, and established the predecessor of General Electric. He was the first benefactor of the University of Oregon, and contributed to other universities, churches, hospitals, and orphanages. He died of a stroke at his country home in New York in 1900.

== Early life and education ==
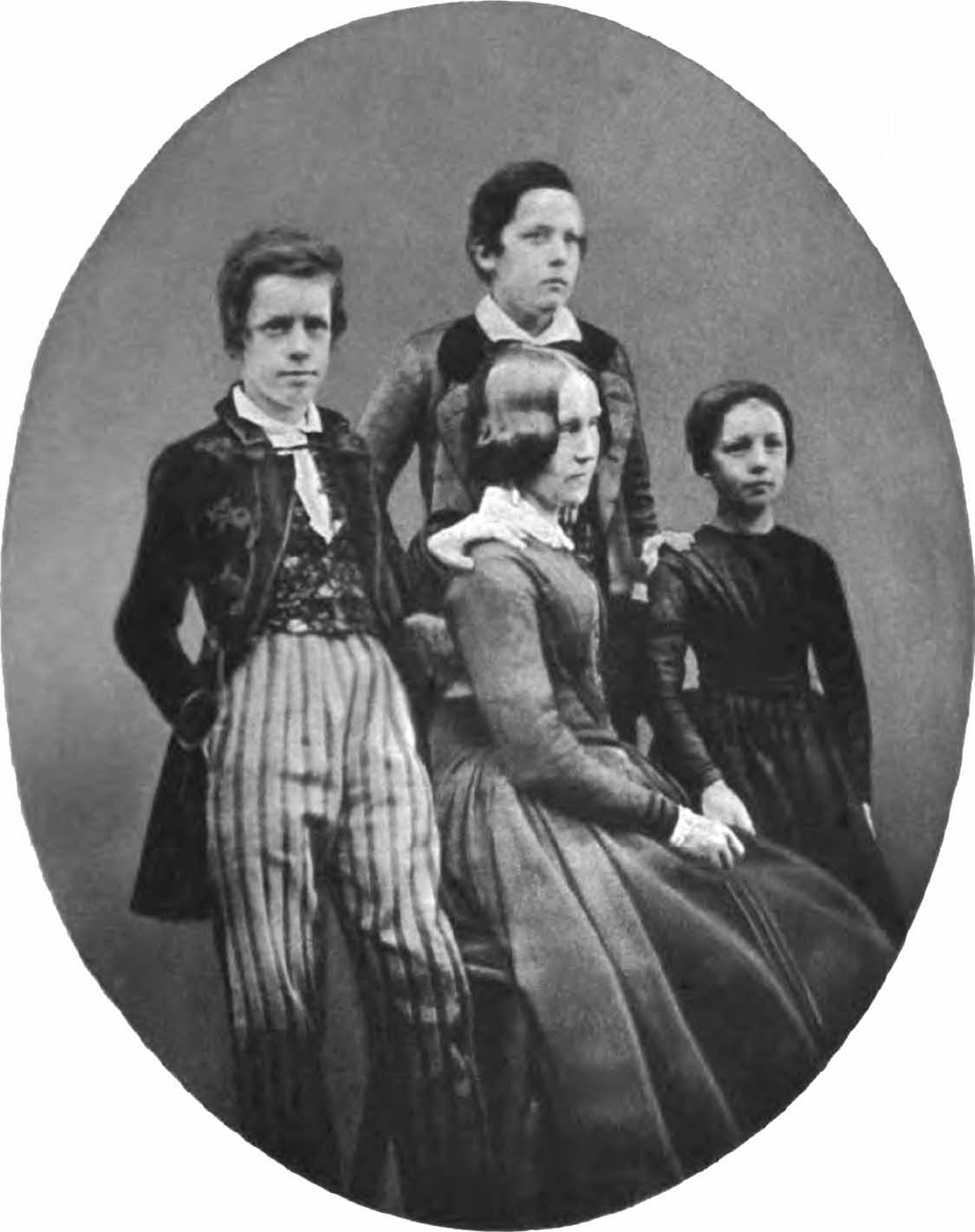
Henry Villard (left) at about age 13, with mother (center), sister Emma (right) and uncle Robert (above)

He was born in Speyer, Palatinate, Kingdom of Bavaria. His parents moved to Zweibrücken in 1839, and in 1856 his father, Gustav Leonhard Hilgard (who died in 1867), became a justice of the Supreme Court of Bavaria, at Munich. He belonged to the Reformed Church. His mother, Katharina Antonia Elisabeth (Lisette) Pfeiffer, was Catholic. While he had aristocratic tendencies, he shared the republican interests of much of the Hilgard clan. His granduncle Theodore Erasmus Hilgard had emigrated to the United States during a clan move of 1833–1835 to Belleville, Illinois; the granduncle had resigned a judgeship so his children could be raised as "freemen". Villard was also a distant relative of the physician and botanist George Engelmann who resided in St. Louis, Missouri.

Villard entered a Gymnasium (equivalent of a United States high school) in Zweibrücken in 1848, which he had to leave because he sympathized with the revolutions of 1848 in Germany. He had broken up a class by refusing to mention the King of Bavaria in a prayer, justifying his omission by citing his loyalty to the provisional government. Another time, after watching a session of the Frankfurt Parliament, he came home in a Hecker hat with a red feather in it. Two of his uncles were strongly in sympathy with the revolution, but his father was a conservative, and disciplined him by sending the boy to continue his education at the French semi-military academy in Phalsbourg (1849–50). Originally his punishment was to be apprenticed, but his father compromised on the military school. Villard showed up for classes a month early so he could be tutored in the French language beforehand by the novelist Alexandre Chatrian.

== Career ==
=== Journalism ===
On emigrating to America, he adopted the name Villard, the surname of a French schoolmate at Phalsbourg, to conceal his identity from anyone intent on making him return to Germany. Making his way westward in 1854, he lived in turn at Cincinnati; Belleville, Illinois, and Peoria, Illinois, where he studied law for a time; and Chicago where he wrote for newspapers. Along with newspaper reporting and various jobs, in 1856 he attempted unsuccessfully to establish a colony of "free soil" Germans in Kansas. In 1856-57 he was editor, and for part of the time was proprietor of the Racine Volksblatt, in which he advocated the election of presidential candidate John C. Frémont of the newly founded Republican Party.

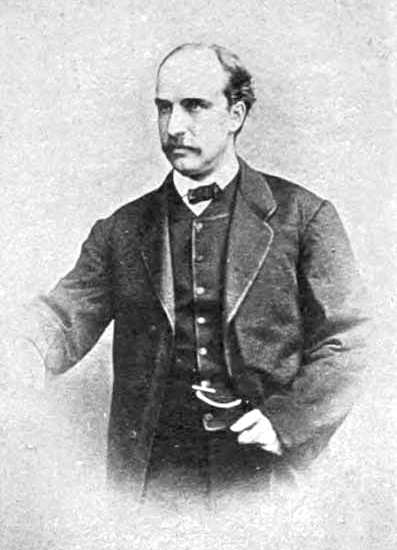
Henry Villard in 1866

Thereafter he was associated with the New Yorker Staats-Zeitung, for which he covered the Lincoln-Douglas debates; Frank Leslie's; the New York Tribune; and with the Cincinnati Commercial Gazette. In 1859, as correspondent of the Commercial, he visited the newly discovered gold region of Colorado. On his return in 1860, he published The Pike's Peak Gold Regions. He also sent statistics to the New York Herald that were intended to influence the location of a Pacific railroad route. He followed Lincoln throughout the 1860 presidential campaign, and was on the presidential train to Washington in 1861. He became a principal correspondent of the New York Herald in 1861. The young Villard was not content with working for a single newspaper and became a pioneer of newspaper syndication.

During the Civil War, he was correspondent for the New York Tribune (with the Army of the Potomac, 1862–63) and was at the front as the representative of a news agency established by him in that year at Washington (1864). Out of his experiences reporting the Civil War, he became a confirmed pacifist. In 1865, when Horace White became managing editor of the Chicago Tribune, Villard became its Washington correspondent. In 1866, he was the correspondent of that paper in the Prusso-Austrian War. He stayed on in Europe in 1867 to report on the Paris Exposition.

At the close of the Civil War, he married Helen Frances Garrison, the daughter of the anti-slavery campaigner William Lloyd Garrison, on January 3, 1866. He returned to the United States from his correspondent duties in Europe in June 1868, and shortly afterward was elected secretary of the American Social Science Association, to which he devoted his labors until 1870, when he went to Germany for his health.

=== Transportation ===
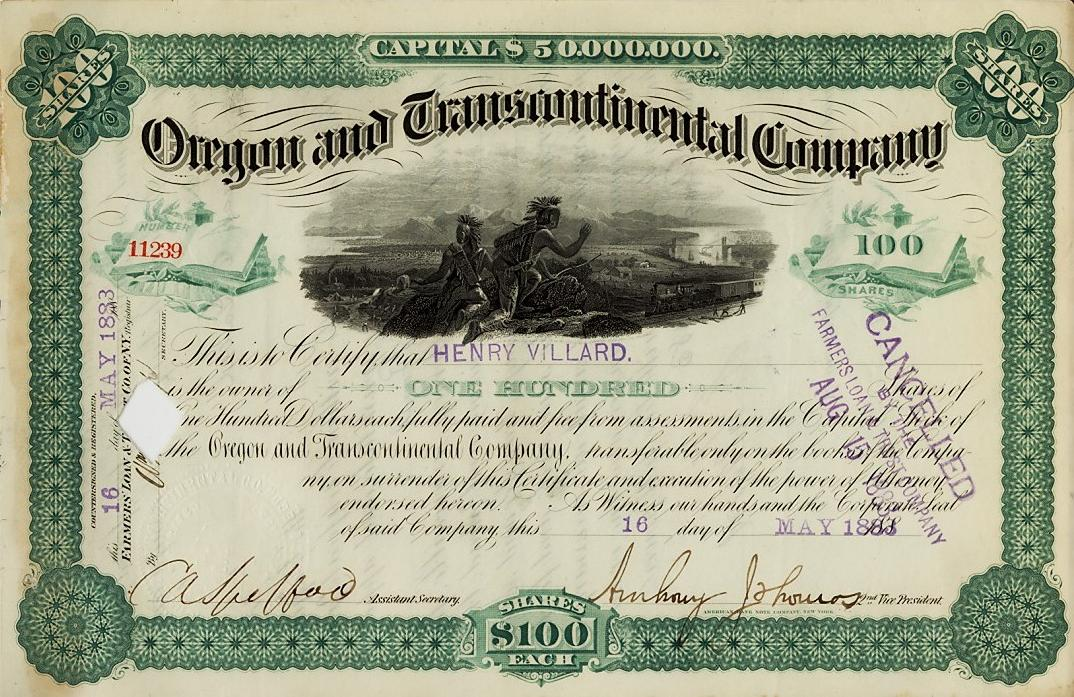
Oregon and Transcontinental stock owned by Henry Villard

In Germany, while living at Wiesbaden, he engaged in the negotiation of American railroad securities. After the Panic of 1873, when many railroad companies defaulted in the payment of interest, he joined several committees of German bond holders, doing the major part of the committee work, and in April 1874 he returned to the United States to represent his constituents, and especially to execute an arrangement with the Oregon and California Railroad Company.

Villard first visited Portland, Oregon, in July 1874. On visiting Oregon, he was impressed with the natural wealth of the region, and conceived the plan of gaining control of its few transportation routes. His clients, who were also large creditors also of the Oregon Steamship Company, approved his scheme, and in 1875 Villard became president of both the steamship company and the Oregon and California Railroad. In 1876, he was appointed a receiver of the Kansas Pacific Railway as the representative of European creditors. He was removed in 1878, but continued the contest he had begun with Jay Gould and finally obtained better terms for the bond holders than they had agreed to accept.

The Pacific Northwest was the booming sector of American expansion. European investors in the Oregon and San Francisco Steamship Line, after building new vessels, became discouraged, and in 1879 Villard formed an American syndicate and purchased the property. He also acquired that of the Oregon Steam Navigation Company, which operated fleets of steamers and portage railroads on the Columbia River. The three companies that he controlled were amalgamated under the name of the Oregon Railroad and Navigation Company.

He began the construction of a railroad up Columbia River. On failing in his effort to obtain a permanent agreement with the Northern Pacific Railway, which had begun its extension into the Washington Territory, Villard used his Columbia River steamship line as his railroad's outlet to the Pacific Ocean. He then succeeded in obtaining a controlling interest in the Northern Pacific property, and organized a new corporation that was named the Oregon and Transcontinental Company. This acquisition was achieved with the aid of a syndicate, called by the press a "blind pool", composed of friends who had loaned him $20 million without knowing his intentions. After some contention with the old managers of the Northern Pacific road, Villard was elected president of a reorganized board of directors on 15 September 1881.

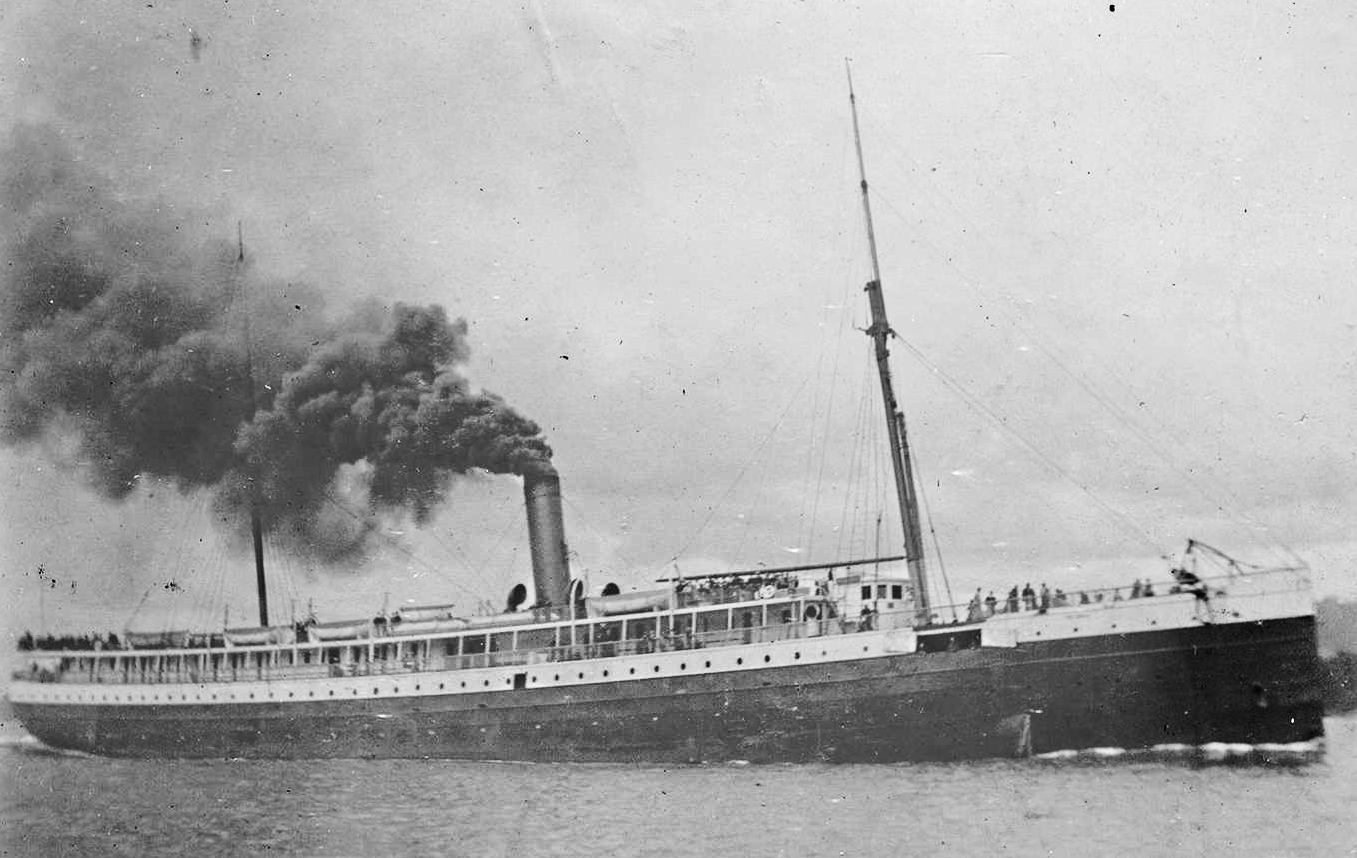
The Oregon Railroad and Navigation Company steamship Columbia. Launched in 1880, it was the first commercial application of Thomas Edison's incandescent light bulb.

After attending Thomas Edison's 1879 Menlo Park, New Jersey, New Year's Eve demonstration of his incandescent light bulb, Villard requested that Edison install one of his lighting systems onboard Oregon Railroad and Navigation's new steamship, the Columbia. Although hesitant at first, Edison eventually agreed to Villard's request. After being mostly completed at the John Roach & Sons shipyard in Chester, Pennsylvania, the Columbia was sent to New York City, where Edison and his personnel installed its lighting system. This made Columbia the first commercial application of Edison's light bulb.

With the aid of the Oregon and Transcontinental Company, his railroad line to the Pacific Ocean was completed, and it was opened to traffic with festivities in September 1883. The project had cost more than expected, and some months later these companies experienced a financial collapse. Villard's financial embarrassment caused the collapse of the stock exchange firm of Decker, Howell, & Co., and Villard's attorney, William Nelson Cromwell, used $1,000,000 to promptly settle with creditors. On 4 January 1884, Villard resigned the presidency of the Northern Pacific. After spending the intervening time in Europe, he returned to New York City in 1886, and purchased for German capitalists large amounts of the securities of the transportation system that he was instrumental in creating, becoming again director of the Northern Pacific, and on 21 June 1888, again president of the Oregon and Transcontinental Company.

=== More acquisitions and mergers ===
In 1881, he acquired the New York Evening Post and The Nation. Villard installed a triumvirate of editors, consisting of his friends Carl Schurz, Edwin L. Godkin and Horace White. White also helped manage Villard's railroad and steamship interests 1876–1891. They had met as newspaper reporters during the Civil War.

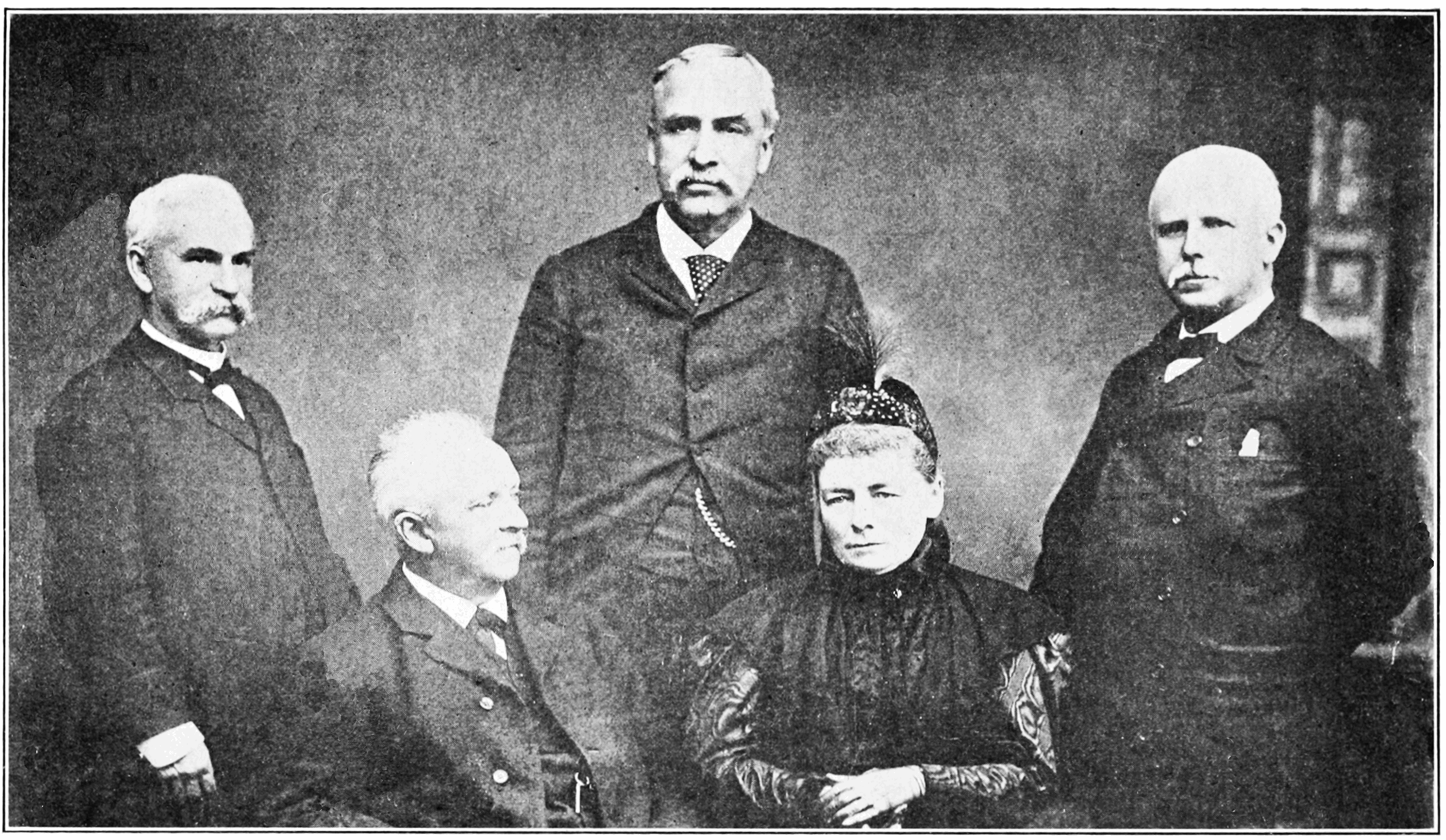
Group photograph of Hermann Helmholtz, his wife (seated) and academic friends Hugo Kronecker (left), Thomas Corwin Mendenhall (right), Henry Villard (center standing) – 1893

Villard had also had a hand in the large electric power business founded by Thomas Edison, merging the Edison Electric Light Company, Edison Lamp Company of Newark, New Jersey, and the Edison Machine Works at Schenectady, New York, to form the Edison General Electric Company. Villard was the president of this concern until 1892 when he was forced out after financier J. P. Morgan engineered a merger with the Thomson-Houston Electric Company that put that company's board in control of the new enterprise, renamed General Electric.

=== Philanthropy ===
In 1883, he paid the debt of the University of Oregon, and gave the institution $50,000. As the University of Oregon's first benefactor, he had Villard Hall, the second building on campus, named after him. He liberally aided the University of Washington Territory. He also aided Harvard University, Columbia University, the Metropolitan Museum of Art and the American Museum of Natural History.

In Speyer he was a main benefactor for the construction of the Memorial Church and a new hospital. There he is still known as Heinrich Hilgard, and a street is named after him (Hilgardstrasse). He has been honoured with the freedom of the city, and there is a bust of him on the compound of the Speyer Diakonissen Hospital.

In Zweibrücken he built an orphanage in 1891. He has also financed a school for nurses. He devoted large sums to the Industrial Art School of Rhenish Bavaria, and to the foundation of fifteen scholarships for the youth of that province.

He supported archaeologist Adolph Bandelier in his research on South American history and archaeology.

== Personal life ==
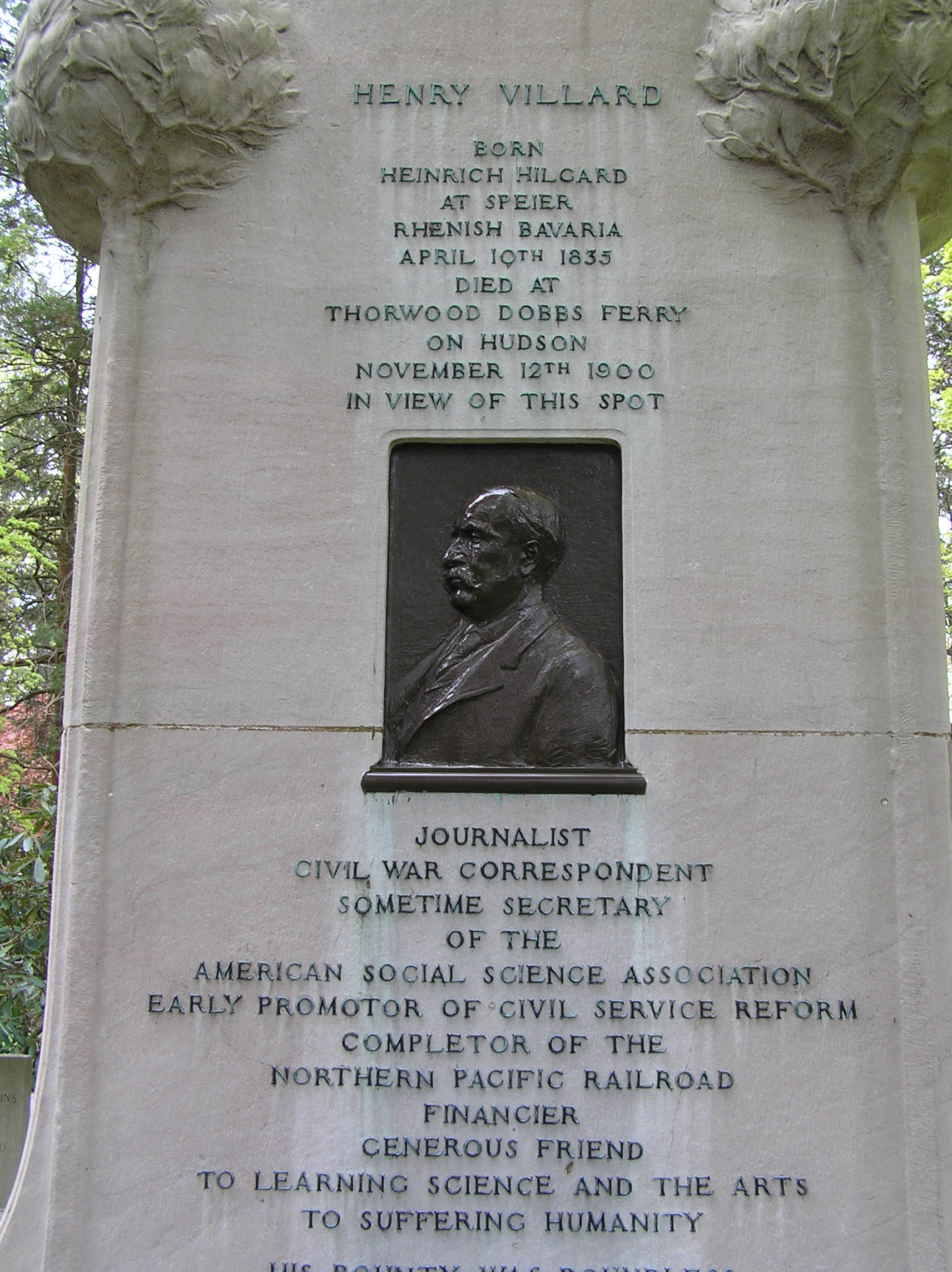
The epitaph of Henry Villard

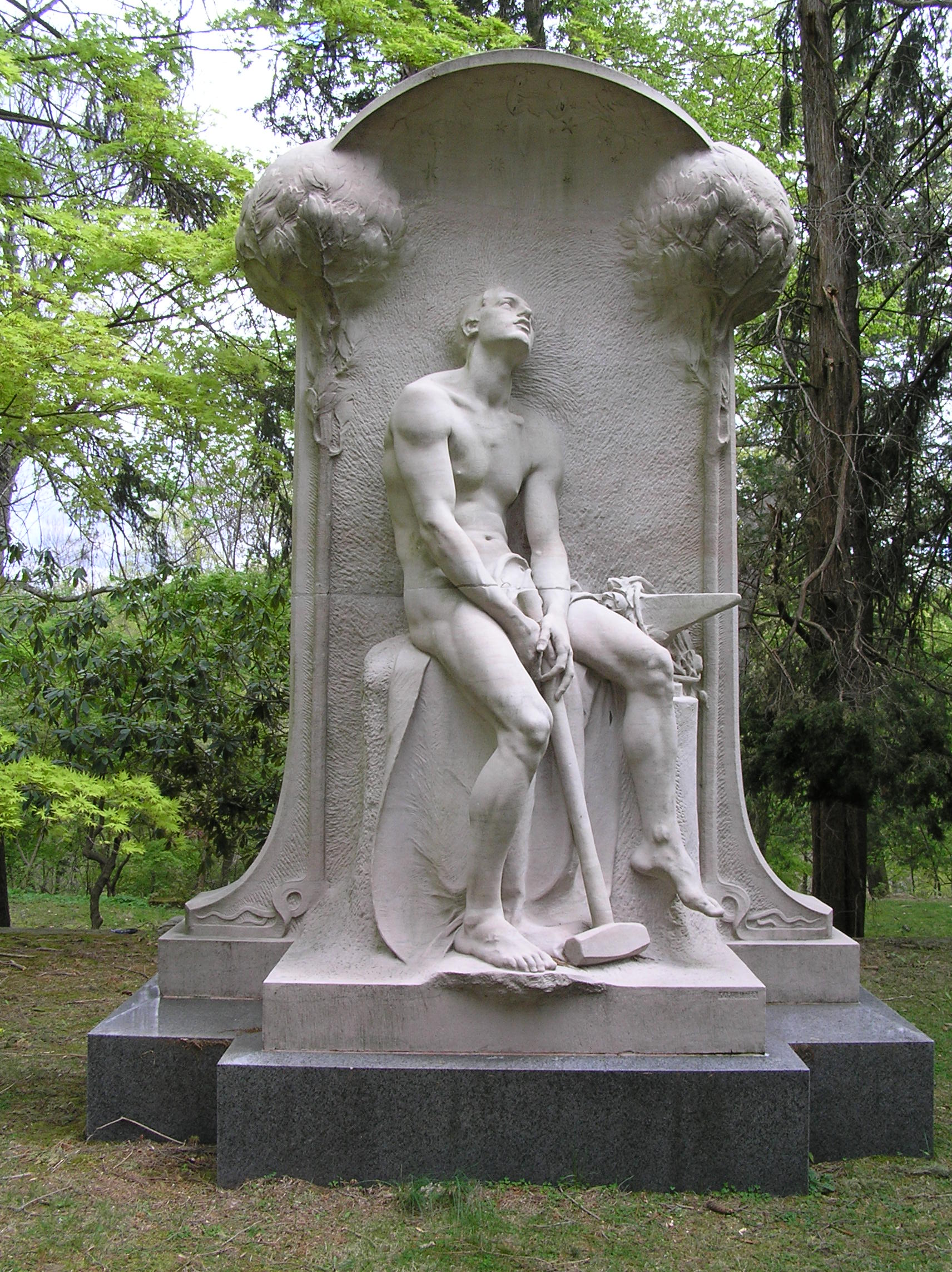
The monument to Henry Villard in Sleepy Hollow Cemetery

In January 1866, he married women's suffrage advocate Helen Frances Garrison (1844–1928), the only daughter of abolitionist William Lloyd Garrison. Together, they were the parents of:

- Helen Elise Villard (1868–1917), who married Dr. James William Bell, an English physician, in 1897, and was a semi-invalid most of her life due to a childhood fall down an elevator shaft at the Westmoreland House.
- Harold Garrison Villard (1869–1952), who married Mariquita Serrano (1864–1936), sister of actor Vincent Serrano, in 1897.
- Oswald Garrison Villard (1872–1949), who married Julia Breckenridge Sanford (1876–1962) and who succeeded his father as owner and publisher of the New York Evening Post and The Nation.
- Henry Hilgard Villard (1883–1890), who died young.

Henry Villard died of a stroke at his country home, Thorwood Park, in Dobbs Ferry, New York. He was interred in the Sleepy Hollow Cemetery in Sleepy Hollow, New York. His autobiography was published posthumously, in 1904. The monument at his grave site was executed by Karl Bitter.

Three years after his death, his daughter Helen brought a suit against the executors and trustees of his will. She claimed that Villard was of unsound mind when he made the will and was the result of fraudulent influence exercised over him by his wife and his two sons. In the will, she was only left $25,000 due to the fact that she married against her father's wishes. She contended that there was no mention of the $200,000 worth of securities she said her father claimed to have left her. Helen lost her suit as the Judge ruled in 1905 that her delay in filing suit had forfeited the right to attack the will. An appeal was rejected by the courts in 1910.

=== Descendants ===
Through his son Harold, he was the grandfather of Henry Serrano Villard (1900–1996), the foreign service officer and ambassador, and Vincent Serrano Villard, and Mariquita Villard Platov.

Through his son Oswald, he was the grandfather of Dorothea Marshall Villard Hammond (1907–1994), a member of the American University in Cairo, Henry Hilgard Villard (1911–1983), the head of the economics department at the City College of New York and the first male president of Planned Parenthood of New York City, and Oswald Garrison Villard Jr. (1916–2004), a professor of electrical engineering at Stanford University.

=== Residences ===
In the late 1870s, Villard bought an old country estate known as "Thorwood Park" in Dobbs Ferry, New York. The home, which featured sweeping views of the Hudson River, was renovated by Charles Follen McKim of McKim, Mead and White in the early 1880s.

In 1884, Villard hired Joseph M. Wells of the architecture firm McKim, Mead and White to design and construct the Villard Houses, which appear as one building but in fact is six separate residences. The houses are located at 455 Madison Avenue between 50th and 51st Street in Manhattan with four of the homes opening onto the courtyard facing Madison, while the other two had entrances on 51st Street. The homes are in the Romanesque Revival style with neo-Renaissance touches and feature elaborate interiors by prominent artists including John La Farge, Augustus Saint-Gaudens, and Maitland Armstrong.

After Villard's bankruptcy, the Villard House was purchased by Elisabeth Mills Reid (1857–1931), wife of Whitelaw Reid, a diplomat and the editor of the New York Tribune, and the daughter of Darius Ogden Mills and the sister of Ogden Mills, bankers and financiers.

== See also ==
- Elizabeth Caruthers

Preceded by Frederick H. Billings	President of Northern Pacific Railway; 1881–1884	Succeeded by Robert Harris
