= Lydia Gilmore =

1915 film by Hugh Ford, Edwin Stanton Porter

- Directed by: Hugh Ford; Edwin S. Porter
- Screenplay by: Hugh Ford; Henry Arthur Jones
- Produced by: Daniel Frohman
- Starring: Pauline Frederick; Vincent Serrano; Thomas Holding; Robert Cain; Helen Lutrell; Jack Curtis
- Production company: Famous Players Film Company
- Distributed by: Paramount Pictures
- Release date: December 26, 1915
- Running time: 50 minutes
- Country: United States
- Language: Silent (English intertitles)

Lydia Gilmore is a 1915 American silent drama film directed by Hugh Ford and Edwin S. Porter and written by Hugh Ford and Henry Arthur Jones. The film stars Pauline Frederick, Vincent Serrano, Thomas Holding, Robert Cain, Helen Lutrell and Jack Curtis. The film was released on December 26, 1915, by Paramount Pictures.

== Cast ==
- Pauline Frederick as Lydia Gilmore
- Vincent Serrano as Dr. Gilmore
- Thomas Holding as Ralph Benham
- Robert Cain as Mr. Stracey
- Helen Lutrell as Mrs. Stracey
- Jack Curtis as Master Ned Gilmore
- M.W. Rale as Detective

== Reception ==
George Blaisdell of The Moving Picture World called the film a "splendid type of finished photoplay" and wrote that the "steady interest of the story itself is enhanced by the work of the cast as well as of the directors." Thomas C. Kennedy of Motography wrote that Porter and Ford "have procured the maximum of dramatic effect out of fine material." He opined that the "dramatic situations are not forced and are arrived at convincingly" and praised the setting and the cinematography. William Ressman Andrews of Motion Picture News praised Frederick's performance and the cinematography.

== Preservation ==
Lydia Gilmore is currently presumed lost. In February of 2021, the film was cited by the National Film Preservation Board on their Lost U.S. Silent Feature Films list.

== See also ==
- Edwin S. Porter filmography
- List of lost films
