= Caruthers Park =

Public park in Portland, Oregon, U.S.

Elizabeth Caruthers Park
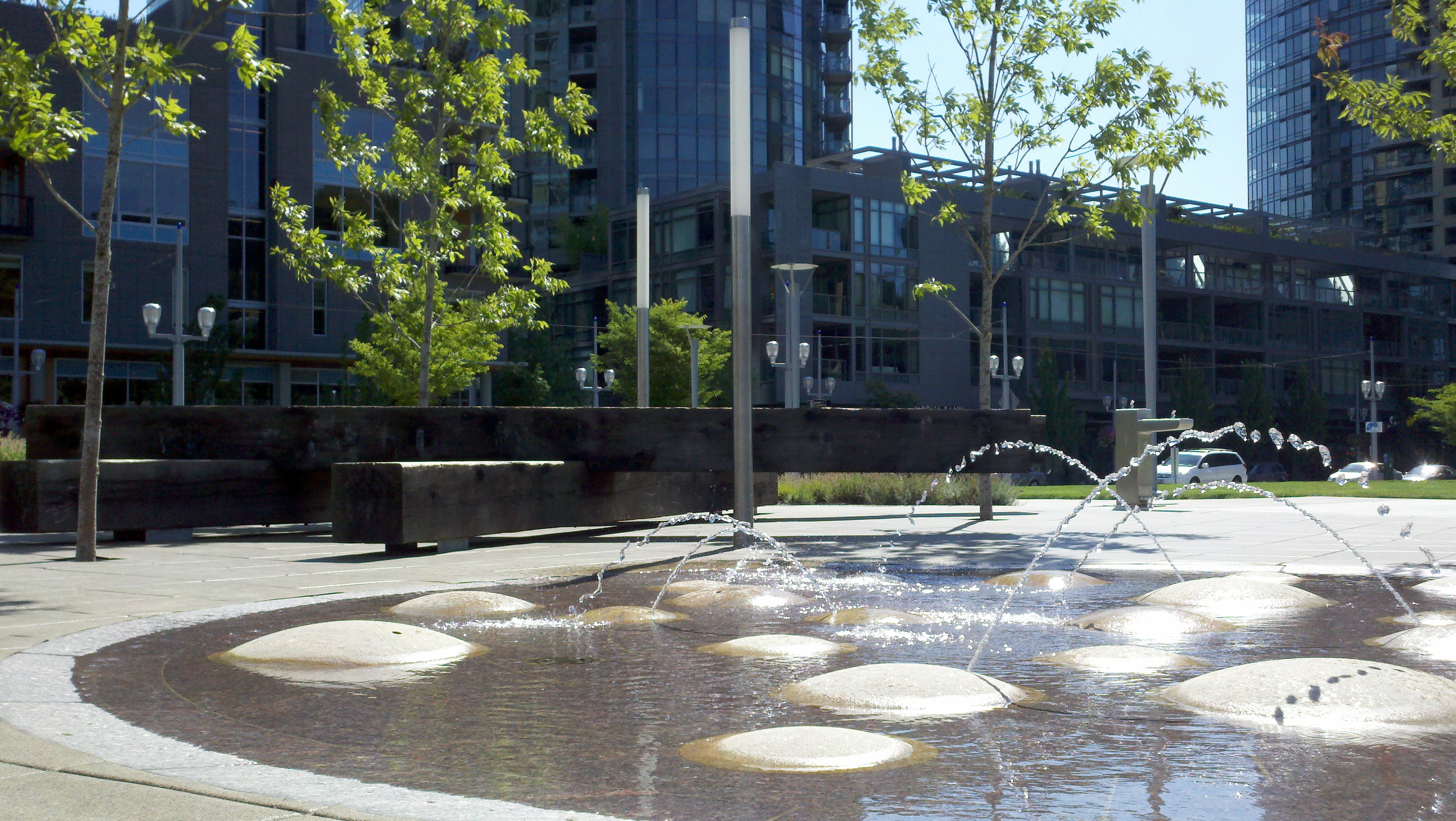
- The fountain at the park, 2011
- Interactive map of Elizabeth Caruthers Park
- Location: 3508 S Moody Avenue; Portland, Oregon
- Coordinates: 45°29′50″N 122°40′17″W
- Area: 2.12 acres (0.86 ha)
- Created: 2009
- Operator: Portland Parks & Recreation
- Public transit: NS S Moody and Gaines; 35, 40

Caruthers Park, officially Elizabeth Caruthers Park, is a park located in South Waterfront, Portland, Oregon. Acquired in 2009, the park is named after Oregon pioneer Elizabeth Caruthers. The park includes a bocce court, public art, "splash pad", and unpaved paths.

== See also ==
- List of parks in Portland, Oregon
