= Horace White (writer) =

American journalist (1834–1916)

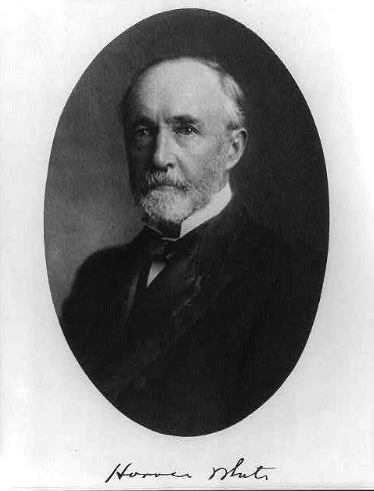
- Born: August 10, 1834; Colebrook, New Hampshire
- Died: September 16, 1916 (aged 82); New York City
- Burial place: Graceland Cemetery
- Occupation: Writer

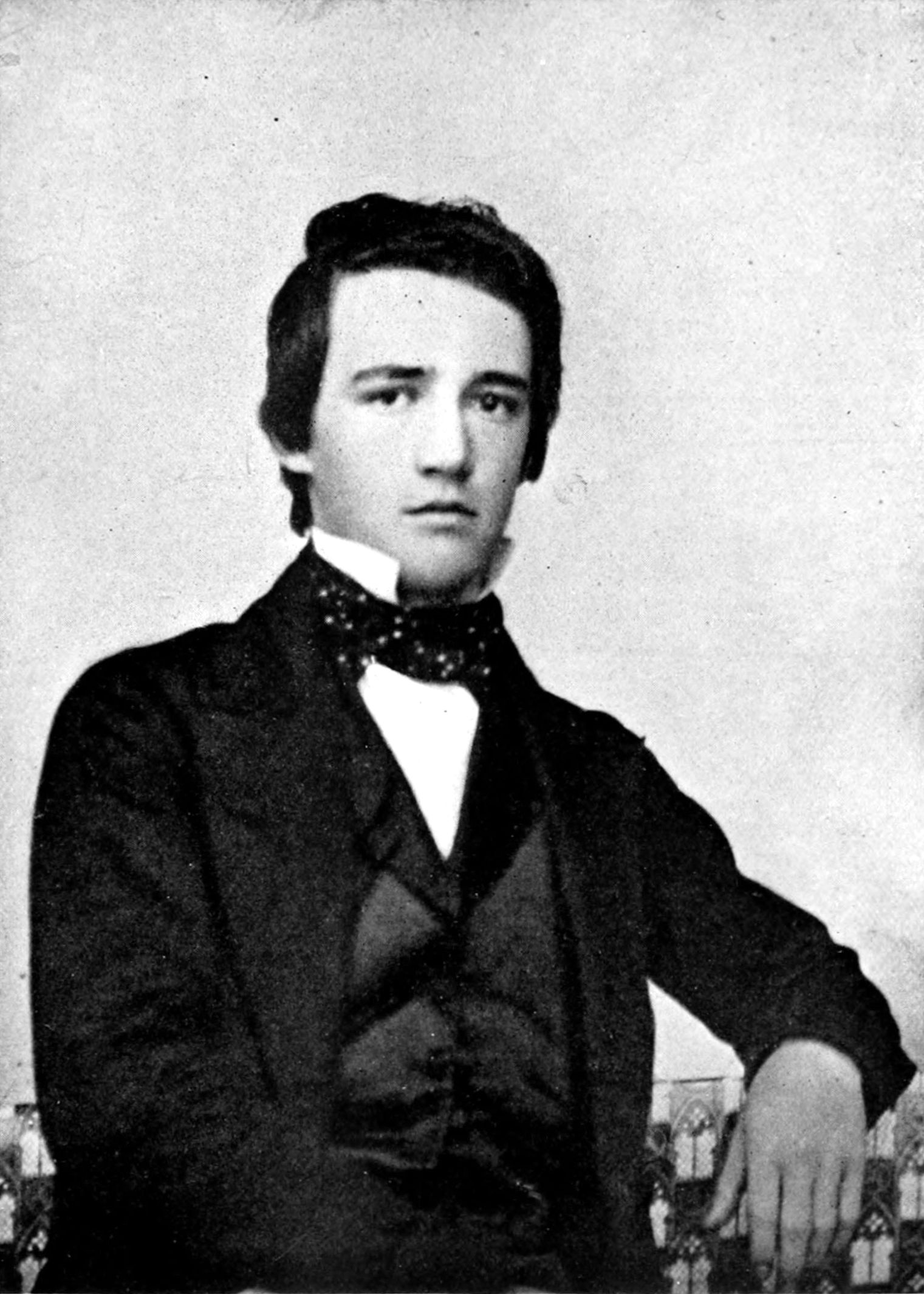
Young Horace White

Horace White (August 10, 1834 – September 16, 1916) was a United States journalist and financial expert, noted for his connection with the Chicago Tribune, the New York Evening Post, and The Nation.

== Biography ==
White was born in Colebrook, New Hampshire. His father was a doctor. In 1837 his family moved to Beloit, Wisconsin, and White graduated at Beloit College in 1853. In 1854, he became city editor of the Chicago Evening Journal. In 1856-57 he served as assistant secretary of the National Kansas Committee.

As a reporter for the Chicago Tribune he accompanied Abraham Lincoln in 1858 in his campaign against Stephen A. Douglas, his account being published in Herndon's Life of Lincoln. As a result, he became friends with Lincoln and Henry Villard. Villard was covering the debates for the New-Yorker Staats-Zeitung. In 1861, White became the Washington correspondent of the Tribune. He headed a syndicate for the publication of Civil War news during 1864.

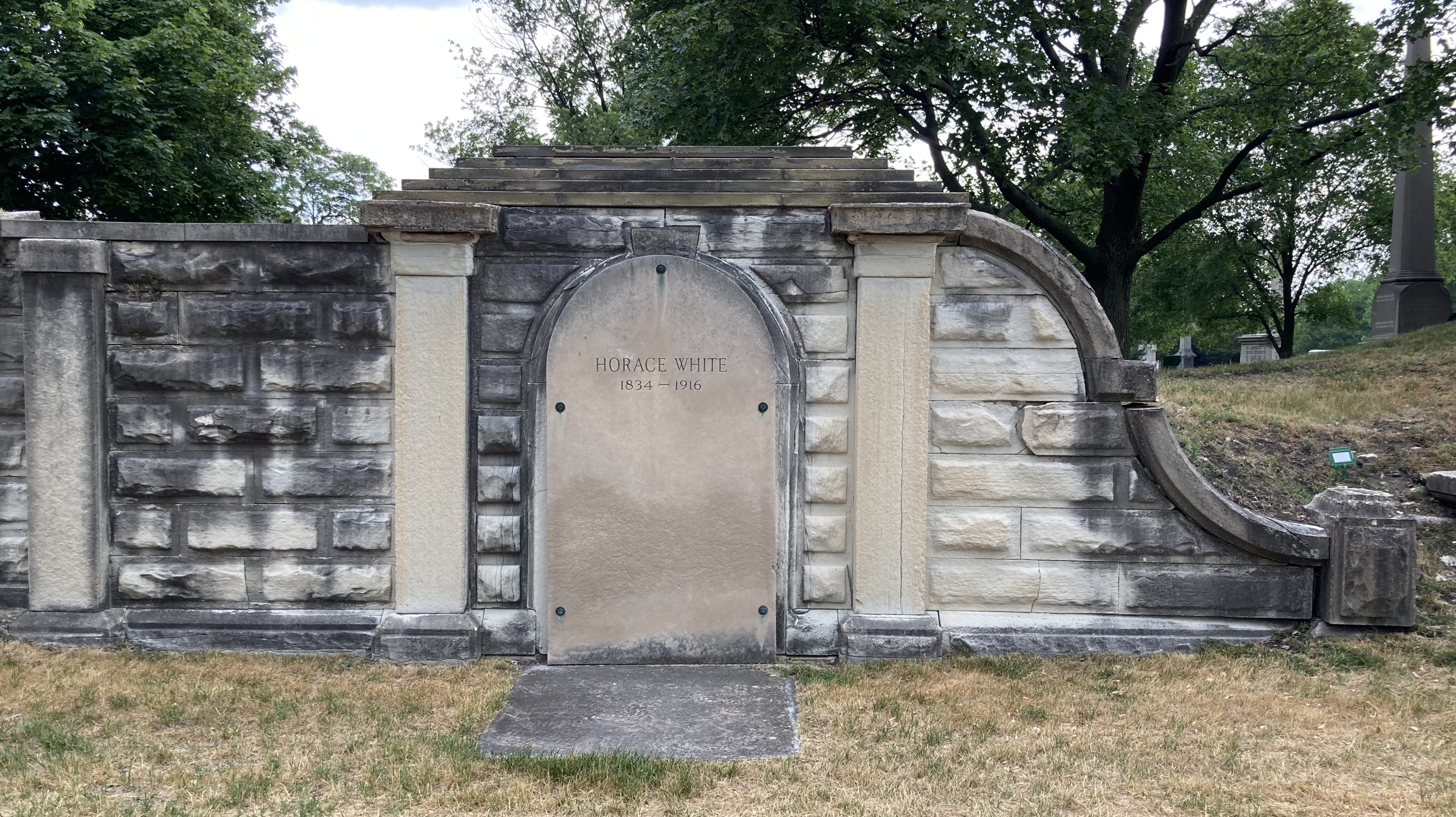
White vault at Graceland Cemetery

From 1864 to 1874 he was editor in chief and one of the owners of the Chicago Tribune. He left the Tribune due to ill health. In 1877, he joined Villard to work successively in two railway firms, and then in 1881, when Villard bought the New York Evening Post and The Nation, White, along with Carl Schurz and Edwin L. Godkin, managed the enterprise. Schurz left in 1883, and Godkin assumed the role of editor in chief. In 1899, White succeeded Godkin as editor in chief, and he held that position until his retirement in 1903. In 1909, he was appointed to the New York State Commission on Speculation and Commodities. He was widely known for his able discussions of currency and banking problems.

He was struck by an automobile in New York City, and died shortly thereafter. He was buried at Graceland Cemetery in Chicago.

== Works ==
=== Original work ===
- Money and Banking illustrated by American History (1895; fifth edition, revised, 1914)
- Life of Lyman Trumbull (1913)

=== Translations ===
- Appian, Roman History (two volumes, 1899), translated from Greek

=== Editor ===
- Frederic Bastiat, Sophismes économiques (Chicago, 1869)
- Luigi Cossa, Scienza delle finanze (New York, 1888)

== Legacy ==
Horace White in his study

White is remembered as proponent of quality journalism aimed at public good. In his "School of Journalism" (1904) he wrote,

The question arises at this point, why are there so many black sheep in journalism? Why so many “fakes”? Why is the epidemic of “yellow journalism” so prevalent? This phrase is applied to newspapers which delight in sensations, crime, scandal, smut, funny pictures, caricatures and malicious or frivolous gossip about persons and things of no public concern. When I entered journalism, the press of the country, with only one exception that I can now recall, was clean, dignified and sober minded. It had various aims in life, aims political, literary, scientific, social, religious, reformatory and mixed, which were deemed by the conductors of the papers advantageous to the commonweal. To make money by pandering to the vices and follies of the community, and thus adding to the mass of vice and folly, was generally unthinkable.
