= Vilar (surname) =

Vilar is a Portuguese, Galician and Catalan surname. Notable people with the surname include:

- Alberto Vilar (a.k.a. Albert Vilar; 1940–2021), American investment banker
- António Vilar (1912–1995), Portuguese-born Spanish actor
- Audric del Vilar (fl.12th-cent.), French Provençal lord and troubadour
- Carlos Alcántara Vilar (born 1964), Peruvian stand-up comedian and actor
- Carlos Vilar (1930–2021), Argentine Snipe sailor; brother of Jorge Vilar
- Eduíno Vilar [see: Communist Party of Portugal (Marxist–Leninist)] (fl.1970–1974), Portuguese communist publisher and politician
- Esther Vilar (born 1935), Argentine author, playwright, and physician
- Fabiana Vilar (born 1986), Brazilian politician
- Federico Vilar (born 1977), Argentine and Mexican footballer
- Fernando Vilar (born 1954), Portuguese-born Uruguayan journalist and news anchor
- Irene Vilar (born c.1969), Puerto Rican American editor, literary agent, author, memoirist, and environmental advocate
- Jean Vilar (1912–1971), French actor, theater director, and scenic designer
- Joan Vilar i Costa (1889–1962), Spanish Jesuit priest, librarian, and exile
- Jorge Vilar (1931–2014), Argentine snipe sailor; brother of sailer Carlos Vilar
- José de Nouvilas de Vilar (c.1843–c.1913), Spanish Puerto Rican soldier and politician
- José Miguel Vilar-Bou (born 1979), Spanish science-fiction and horror writer, and journalist
- Marcelo Vilar (born 1961), Brazilian football manager
- Pierre Vilar (1906–2003), French historian and writer
- Raf Vilar (a.k.a. Rafael Vilar; born ?), Brazilian-born British singer-songwriter
- Ricardo Vilar (born 1985), Brazilian footballer
- Roberto Vilar (born 1971), Spanish comedian, television presenter, and actor
- Roberto Vilar (footballer) (born 1976), Portuguese footballer
- Tesa Vilar (born 1995), Slovenian racing cyclist
- Tracy Vilar (born 1968), American actor, casting director, and producer
- Vicente Vilar David (1889–1937), Spanish Catholic martyr, venerated Christian, and engineer
