= Liz Thomas (scientist) =

British climate scientist

Liz Thomas is a British climate scientist, specializing in paleoclimatology. Her research mainly focuses on historic climate variability in the Antarctic, and she oversees the British Antarctic Survey's work on collecting and studying ice cores.

== Career ==
Thomas primarily conducts research on paleoclimatology, making extensive use of ice cores to study historic climate change in the Southern Hemisphere, particularly the Antarctic

After graduating from the University of Southampton, she obtained a Ph.D. in paleoclimatology through the Open University, joining the British Antarctic Survey as part of her doctoral work in the early 2000s.

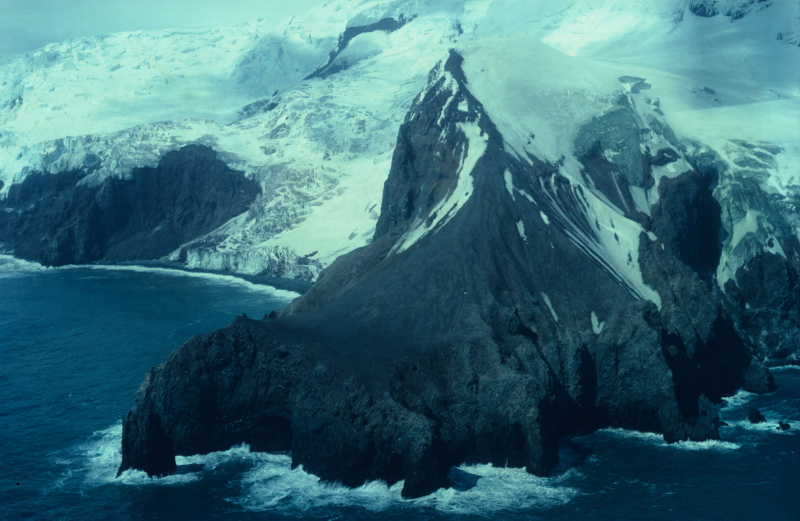
Bouvet Island, where Liz Thomas and her team traveled by helicopter to extract an ice core sample.

She subsequently became the director of the British Antarctic Survey's ice core group, which conducts research using ice core samples in the Arctic and Antarctic.

In 2016 and 2017, she led the first-ever expedition to drill ice cores from sub-Antarctic islands, including Bouvet Island, the Balleny Islands, and Peter I Island.

She has also conducted fieldwork in Greenland and Svalbard.

Notably, Thomas led research to compile the first comprehensive record of snowfall in the Antarctic going back centuries, which showed an increase in snowfall in the continent over that period.

In 2019, she was the recipient of a National Geographic Explorer grant.
