= Roberto Vilar (footballer) =

Portuguese footballer

Personal information
- Full name: Roberto Jorge Martins Vilar
- Date of birth: 10 November 1976 (age 49)
- Place of birth: Feira, Santa Maria da Feira, Portugal
- Height: 1.78 m (5 ft 10 in)
- Position: Midfielder

Youth career
- 1988–1991: Feirense
- 1991–1995: União de Lamas

Senior career*
Years	Team	Apps	(Gls)
1995–1998	União de Lamas	8	(1)
1998–1999	São João de Ver	14	(5)
1999	Cucujães	4	(0)
2000	Castêlo da Maia		
2000–2003	São João de Ver	68	(6)
2003–2006	Madalena		
2006–2007	Marítimo Graciosa		
2007–2008	Lagoa	3	(0)
2008–2010	Valecambrense		
- * Club domestic league appearances and goals

Roberto Vilar (born 10 November 1976) is a retired Portuguese football midfielder.
