= Liz Thomas =

American thru-hiker (born 1987)

Elizabeth Thomas
- Born: 1987 (age 38–39); Sacramento, California, U.S.
- Education: Claremont McKenna College; Yale School of Forestry & Environmental Studies (MS)
- Occupations: Hiker, editor
- Awards: Doris Duke Conservation Fellowship

Elizabeth Thomas (born 1987) is a thru-hiking champion and former women's unassisted speed record holder for the 2,181-mile (3,510 km) Appalachian Trail. She holds the hiking "Triple Crown," having completed the Appalachian Trail, Pacific Crest Trail, and the Continental Divide Trail. She is the pioneer of the Chinook Trail in Washington and the Wasatch Range in Utah. She is Vice President of the American Long Distance Hiking Association-West, an ambassador for the American Hiking Society, and an outdoors writer for Wirecutter, a New York Times publication. She is also Editor-in-Chief of Treeline Review, a hiking gear publication. As of 2018, she completed 20 long-distance wilderness hikes.

== Early life ==
Thomas was born in Sacramento, California and experienced a "typical suburban upbringing." As a child she was "really drawn to nature, but [...] wasn’t really that active." However, a first-grade trip to a mile-long nature trail made a big impression on her, and from then on she attempted to get her parents to take her back to the trail on weekends. (Cascade Hiker Podcast, Ep. 127, 4:30) Thomas's mother was born and raised "in a Japan that--and even now--is not really for equality...not a great place to be a woman. Women didn't really do physical activity, they didn’t run or anything;" therefore, Thomas's "becoming physically active, becoming adventurous was a way [she] rebelled as a teenager." Her first extended urban hike was in Los Angeles, during which she traversed a 180-mile route that connected 300 staircases.

== Education ==
Thomas attended Claremont McKenna College. During her years there, she became involved in outdoors clubs with fellow students and met professors who were also enthusiastic about hiking. (Cascade Hiker Podcast, Ep. 127, 5:42) After graduating, she earned a Master's in Environmental Science from the Yale School of Forestry & Environmental Studies. In the process, Thomas received the Doris Duke Conservation Fellowship for her research on long-distance hiking trails, conservation, and trail town communities.

== Career ==
Thomas had never been backpacking as of 2007. A year later, the summer after her senior year of college, she completed her first thru-hike, the Tahoe Rim Trail, solo in six days. At the time, she "had a lot of experience dayhiking solo and doing big peakbagging trips with <24 hour goals" and had "car camped" and led a five-day backpacking trip in the Grand Canyon, but had never "overnight-in-the-woods" hiked. She later completed her first major thru-hike: the 2,181-mile (3,510 km) Appalachian Trail. In 2010, Thomas completed the 3,100-mile (5,000 km) Continental Divide Trail.

Thomas has worked with the American Hiking Society since 2010, when she attended Hike the Hill in Washington D.C., a national event that unifies trail organizations, agencies, and politicians to advance the American trail system. In 2011, Thomas hiked the 2,181-mile Appalachian Trail, from Georgia to Maine, in 80 days and 13 hours. Her trek set a record for the fastest female thru-hike of the Appalachian Trail. The female record was broken by Heather “Anish” Anderson in 2015, who simultaneously broke the male record held at the time by Matt Kirk. In 2018, Karel Sabbe beat Anderson's record.

In 2013, Thomas near-completed a thru-hike of all of Denver, Colorado's breweries. In 2014, Thomas, Whitney La Ruffa, and Brian Boshart pioneered the approximately 290-mile Chinook Trail in Washington. In 2015, Thomas trekked the Sierra High Route. In 2017, Thomas published her book, Long Trails: Mastering the Art of the Thru-hike. In August 2019, Thomas was featured in Condé Nast Traveller's feature story 14 Globetrotters Redefining the Way We Travel. In March 2020, Thomas will be the keynote speaker at the Texas Trails and Active Transportation Conference.

Thomas leads groups on urban hikes of 11 American cities. One of the tours is the eight-day Urban Brew Thru, her thru-hike of every brewery in Denver, Colorado, totaling 60 establishments, the course charting in at 88 miles. She also leads the six-week online course Thru-Hiking 101 for Backpacker Magazine and speaks at "colleges, outdoor clubs, hiking clubs, [and] women's groups."

== Bibliography ==
- Long Trails: Mastering the Art of the Thru-hike (2017)

== Awards and recognition ==
- Doris Duke Conservation Fellowship

== Podcasts ==
Date	Show	Episode	Role
June 18, 2019	Tough Girl Challenges	"Liz Thomas, Queen of Urban Hiking"	Guest
Nov. 19, 2018	Cascade Hiker Podcast	"135: Treeline Review with Liz Thomas"	Guest
Nov. 5, 2018	By Land	"Episode 52: Learn To Thru Hike with Liz Thomas"	Guest
Sept. 24, 2018	Cascade Hiker Podcast	"127: Liz "Snorkel" Thomas—Her Story"	Guest
Feb. 19, 2018	The Adventure Sports Podcast	"Ep. 350: Mastering the Art of the Thru-Hike--Liz 'Snorkel' Thomas"	Guest
Jan. 4, 2018	Dirt in Your Skirt	"#78: Liz Thomas - Author, Thru-Hiker, Environmentalist"	Guest
