= Villari (company) =

Italian porcelain craft workshop

VILLARI
- Company type: Società a responsabilità limitata
- Founded: 25 April 1967
- Founder: Cesare Villari and Silvia Villari
- Headquarters: Solagna, province of Vicenza, Italy
- Website: https://villari.it/

VILLARI (formerly known as Porcellane VILLARI) is a former Italian porcelain craft workshop founded in 1967 by Cesare and Silvia Villari in Solagna, Italy.

== History ==
Villari was established in 1967 by two founders, Cesare Villari and Silvia Villari as a porcelain craft workshop in Solagna, Italy. Initially, it has been focused on the production of fine porcelain figurines inspired by Capodimonte. In the 1970s, the company expanded its product line to include cups, vases, and chandeliers adorned with handcrafted porcelain flowers. In 2000, a collection dedicated to reproductions of neoclassical objects, many of which are in the Hermitage Museum in St. Petersburg, was developed. This led to the Grande Impero Collection, which draws on the forms of the Empire Style that spread in France in the second phase of the neoclassical period (between the 18th and 19th centuries).

The brand is distributed worldwide through single-brand boutiques in major world capitals such as Dubai (Dubai Mall), London (Harrods), Istanbul, Beijing and more.

VILLARI's products include lighting, fine porcelain, home decor, table top, bathroom accessories, home fragrance, scented candles, corporate gifts, architect & designer's, resource, and jewelry.

== Collaboration with artists ==
In 1988, VILLARI created two works commissioned by the American pop art artist Jeff Koons: "St. John the Baptist," a free interpretation of Leonardo da Vinci's "St. John the Baptist," produced in four copies. The other life-size statue was "Michael Jackson and Bubbles," which depicts the singer with his small chimpanzee, painted entirely in 24-carat gold leaf.

On May 15, 2001, one of the five copies of "Michael Jackson and Bubbles" was auctioned and sold to an anonymous collector for $5,615,000 by Sotheby's – New York. These works have been exhibited in various museums worldwide, including the Guggenheim Museum in Bilbao, Munich, Cologne, Berlin, Guggenheim, and the MOMA in San Francisco.

More recent VILLARI's collaborations with artists and designers include, Fabio Novembre, Ferruccio Laviani, Li-Jen Shih, Giulio Gianturco, CQ Studio, Elena Xausa, Ramz (About Abdul Al-Romaizan).
