= Elizabeth Caruthers =

- Born: Tennessee, United States
- Died: 1857; Portland, Oregon, United States
- Occupation: Pioneer settler
- Spouse: Joe Thomas
- Children: Finice Caruthers

Elizabeth Caruthers was a pioneer settler in Portland in Oregon Country. Born in Tennessee, she married Joe Thomas in 1816, and the couple had one son, Finice. The Thomases separated early, and many years later Caruthers and her son re-located to Portland, settling near the Willamette River in 1847.

Filing claims under the Donation Land Claim Act of 1850, the mother and son acquired 320 acres (130 ha) each and built a house in what later became known as the South Portland neighborhood. In 1855, Caruthers, her son, and James Terwilliger deeded 10 acres (4.0 ha) of land to the city for a cemetery.

A stream flowing down Marquam Gulch through the Caruthers' property and into the river came to be known as Caruthers Creek. In 1856, Finice Caruthers and Stephen Coffin, doing business as the Pioneer Water Works, began providing water from the creek to lower downtown Portland through rudimentary pipes made from fir logs. This was the first formal water system in the city, otherwise supplied only by private wells, which were becoming increasingly endangered by pollution as the city grew.

Questions about ownership of the Caruthers' land arose soon after Finice Caruthers died in 1860. Elizabeth Thomas Caruthers, who had generally relied on her maiden name after her split with Joe Thomas, had nevertheless filed her land claim as Elizabeth Thomas. She told people that although married to Thomas, she believed he had died in 1821. In 1857, when Elizabeth died, Finice inherited her claim. When he died three years later, he left no will, and he had no immediate family.

Subsequent legal proceedings led to various claims on the Caruthers' land. One of them involved the assertion that women had no legal right to property acquired via the Donation Land Claim Act. However, in 1868, the U.S. Supreme Court resolved the issue, ruling that under the Land Claim Act a woman, whether married or not, had the same property rights as a man.

Others who wanted to acquire the Caruthers' properties looked for the supposedly dead Joe Thomas, and in 1872 they persuaded a court that they had found him. During legal proceedings that followed, the parties involved agreed to a compromise. An entity called the South Portland Real Estate Association acquired all the claims to the land and eventually sold the property to financier Henry Villard.

In 2009, the City of Portland established Elizabeth Caruthers Park on 2.12 acres (0.86 ha) of land in the South Portland neighborhood. In addition to the park and the creek, SW Caruthers Street and SE Caruthers Street are named for Elizabeth and Finice.
