= Oswald Garrison Villard =

American journalist and editor (1872–1949)

Oswald Villard
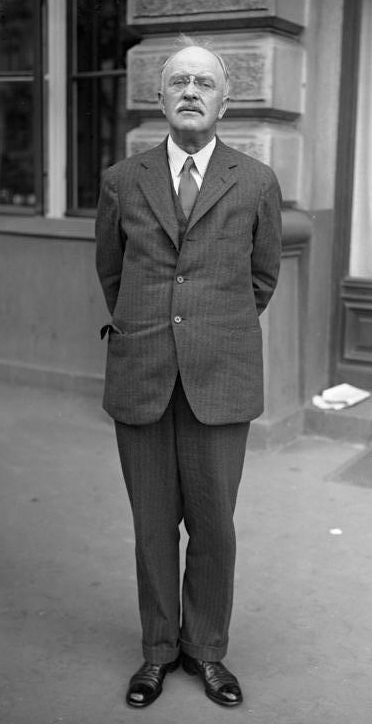
- Villard in 1930

Chair of the National Association for the Advancement of Colored People
- In office 1911–1914
- Preceded by: William English Walling
- Succeeded by: Joel Elias Spingarn

Personal details
- Born: Oswald Garrison Villard; March 13, 1872 Wiesbaden, Germany
- Died: October 1, 1949 (aged 77) New York City, New York, U.S.
- Children: 3, including Oswald
- Relatives: Henry Villard, father Fanny Garrison Villard, mother William Lloyd Garrison, grandfather
- Education: Harvard University (BA)

Oswald Garrison Villard (March 13, 1872 – October 1, 1949) was an American journalist and editor of the New York Evening Post. He was a civil rights activist, and along with his mother, Fanny Villard, a founding member of the NAACP. In 1913, he wrote to President Woodrow Wilson to protest his administration's racial segregation of federal offices in Washington, D.C., a change from previous integrated conditions. He was a leading liberal spokesman in the 1920s and 1930s, then turned conservative.

Villard was a founder of the American Anti-Imperialist League, favoring independence for territories taken in the Spanish–American War. He provided a rare direct link between the anti-imperialism of the late 19th century and the conservative Old Right of the 1930s and 1940s.

== Early life and career ==
At Harvard, c. 1893

Villard was born in Wiesbaden, Germany, on March 13, 1872, while his parents were living there. He was the son of Henry Villard, an American newspaper correspondent who had been an immigrant from Germany, and Fanny (Garrison) Villard, daughter of abolitionist William Lloyd Garrison. Fanny Villard was a suffragist and one of the founders of the Women's Peace Movement. His father later invested in railroads, and bought The Nation and the New York Evening Post in 1881. The family returned to the United States soon after Villard's birth, settling in New York City in 1876.

Villard graduated from Harvard University in 1893 and, after touring Europe with his father for a year, returned to Harvard to earn his graduate degree in American history. He served as a teaching assistant, and could have pursued a career in academia, but desired a more active life. In 1896 he joined the staff of The Philadelphia Press, but disliked the paper's pandering to advertisers. He soon joined the staff of his father's Evening Post, serving as the editor of the Saturday features page. He began to write regularly for the New York Evening Post and The Nation, and said that he and his fellow staff members were

... radical on peace and war and on the Negro question; radical in our insistence that the United States stay at home and not go to war abroad and impose its imperialistic will upon Latin-American republics, often with great slaughter. We were radical in our demand for free trade and our complete opposition to the whole protective system.

== Advocacy and activism ==
Villard was also a founder of the American Anti-Imperialist League, which favored independence for the territories captured in the Spanish–American War. To further the cause, he worked to organize "a third ticket" in 1900 to challenge William Jennings Bryan and William McKinley. He was joined in this effort by several key veterans of the 1896 National Democratic Party. Not surprisingly, Villard made a personal appeal to ex-president Grover Cleveland, a hero of the gold Democrats, urging him to be the candidate. Cleveland demurred, asserting that voters no longer cared what he had to say. Villard also consistently used the editorial page of the Evening Post to argue against imperialism and expansionism.

In 1910, he donated space in the New York Evening Post for the "call" to the meeting that formally organized the National Association for the Advancement of Colored People (NAACP). Villard became a co-founder of the organization, along with W. E. B. Du Bois and other influential individuals. For many years, Villard served as the NAACP's disbursing treasurer while Moorfield Storey, another Cleveland Democrat, was its president.

Villard supported Woodrow Wilson in the 1912 election, and during an interview with the president convinced Wilson to work to improve conditions for African Americans. He protested by writing to Wilson in July 1913 about his administration's segregation of federal offices in the capital, a change from previous practice. Booker T. Washington appealed to Villard to get Wilson to change his policy. Wilson defended these policies and did little to help blacks during his administrations. Although many African Americans had crossed party lines to vote for him, few were appointed to higher level civil service positions. In addition, Wilson did nothing to encourage the end of disenfranchisement of blacks in the South by Democratic-dominated legislatures, which had largely excluded African Americans there from the political system. Consequently, Villard turned against the president, endorsing his opponents and editorializing against him in the Evening Post and the Nation.

Villard opposed Wilson's plan for the League of Nations, and in 1921 was speaking in Cincinnati, Ohio when a violent mob attempted to disrupt a speech against the League.

== Books and writings ==
In 1910, Villard published John Brown 1800-1859: A Biography Fifty Years After, which portrayed Brown as an inspiring American hero. It was praised by reviewers for its unbiased tone and use of new information.

Villard also wrote Germany Embattled (1915), in which he urged readers to acknowledge German contributions to American life and described the political divide in Germany. He reminded readers that the Germans believed in their cause, and advocated for continued neutrality in the European conflict. Villard followed this with two further studies of Germany: The German Phoenix: The Story of the Republic (1933) and Inside Germany; with an Epilogue, England at War (1939; reprinted as Within Germany, 1940). Villard used the former to examine postwar German contributions to art, politics, journalism, education and morality. His third book discussed Adolf Hitler's brutal Nazi policies and the plight of German civilians.

Villard wrote many books critical of journalists and newspapers. His stated goal was to improve journalistic standards, which he believed had succumbed to big business and diminishing integrity. He felt that his contemporaries were sacrificing integrity for monetary contributions from businesses and politicians. He also published many of his articles and addresses on a wide range of subjects including militarism, music, the Garrison family, and racial discrimination. Finally, Villard published an account of his father's early obstacles and accomplishments. He also wrote an autobiography entitled Fighting Years: Memoirs of a Liberal Editor, which was well-reviewed and celebrated.

== Liberal spokesman ==
While Villard continued to champion civil liberties, civil rights, and anti-imperialism after World War I, he largely abandoned his previous belief in laissez-faire economics. During the 1930s, he welcomed the advent of the New Deal and called for nationalization of major industries. In 1943, he engaged in a debate with philosopher Ayn Rand on the topic of collectivism versus individualism, sponsored by the American Economic Association, which was published in a number of newspapers.

== Conservative spokesman ==
Always independent-minded, however, he bitterly dissented from the foreign policy of the administration of Franklin D. Roosevelt in the late 1930s. He was an early member of the non-interventionist America First Committee which opposed U.S. entry into World War II, and used the editorial page of The Nation to express his views:

No, the truth is that if reason and logic, and not sentiment, hysteria, and self-interest, were applied to this question, the American army and navy would take the lead in advocating disarmament—always provided that we are not going to be so insane as to go to war in Europe again. I am even hoping that my friends the editors of The Nation will now turn about and join me in exposing the needless waste of the terrific military expenditures we are now making, to say nothing of the steady militarization of the country.

He broke completely with The Nation, which he had sold in 1935 because it supported American intervention. At the same time, he became increasingly repelled by the New Deal bureaucratic state, which he condemned as a precursor to American fascism. Also, he deplored the air raids carried out by the allies in the later years of World War II, saying:

What was criminal in Coventry, Rotterdam, Warsaw and London has now become heroic in Dresden and now Tokyo.

After 1945, Villard made common cause with "old right" conservatives, such as Senator Robert A. Taft, Felix Morley, and John T. Flynn, against the Cold War policies of Harry S. Truman.

Villard suffered a heart attack in 1944 and sustained a stroke five years later. He died on October 1, 1949, in New York City.

== Family and legacy ==
His oldest son, Henry Hilgard Villard, was head of the economics department at the City College of New York and the first male president of Planned Parenthood of New York City. His youngest son, Oswald Garrison Villard Jr., was a professor of electrical engineering at Stanford University. His daughter, Dorothy Villard Hammond, was a member of the American University in Cairo.

On February 21, 2009, the US Postal Service issued a commemorative stamp honoring Villard's civil rights work.
