= Eugene V. McAuliffe =

American Career Foreign Service Officer

Ford, Ambassador Designate Eugene V. McAuliffe (Hungary) - March 28, 1975(Gerald Ford Library)(1553009)

Eugene Vincent McAuliffe (November 25, 1918 – February 9, 2000) was an American Career Foreign Service Officer who served as Ambassador Extraordinary and Plenipotentiary to Hungary (1975–1976). He also served as Deputy Defense Secretary for International Security Affairs (May 6, 1976 – April 1, 1977) and deputy head of the American NATO Mission.

McAuliffe was born in Boston, Massachusetts, on November 25, 1918. He served in the Army in World War II, then entered the Foreign Service. He died in Duxbury, Massachusetts, on February 9, 2000, at the age of 81.
