= Vincent Serrano =

American actor

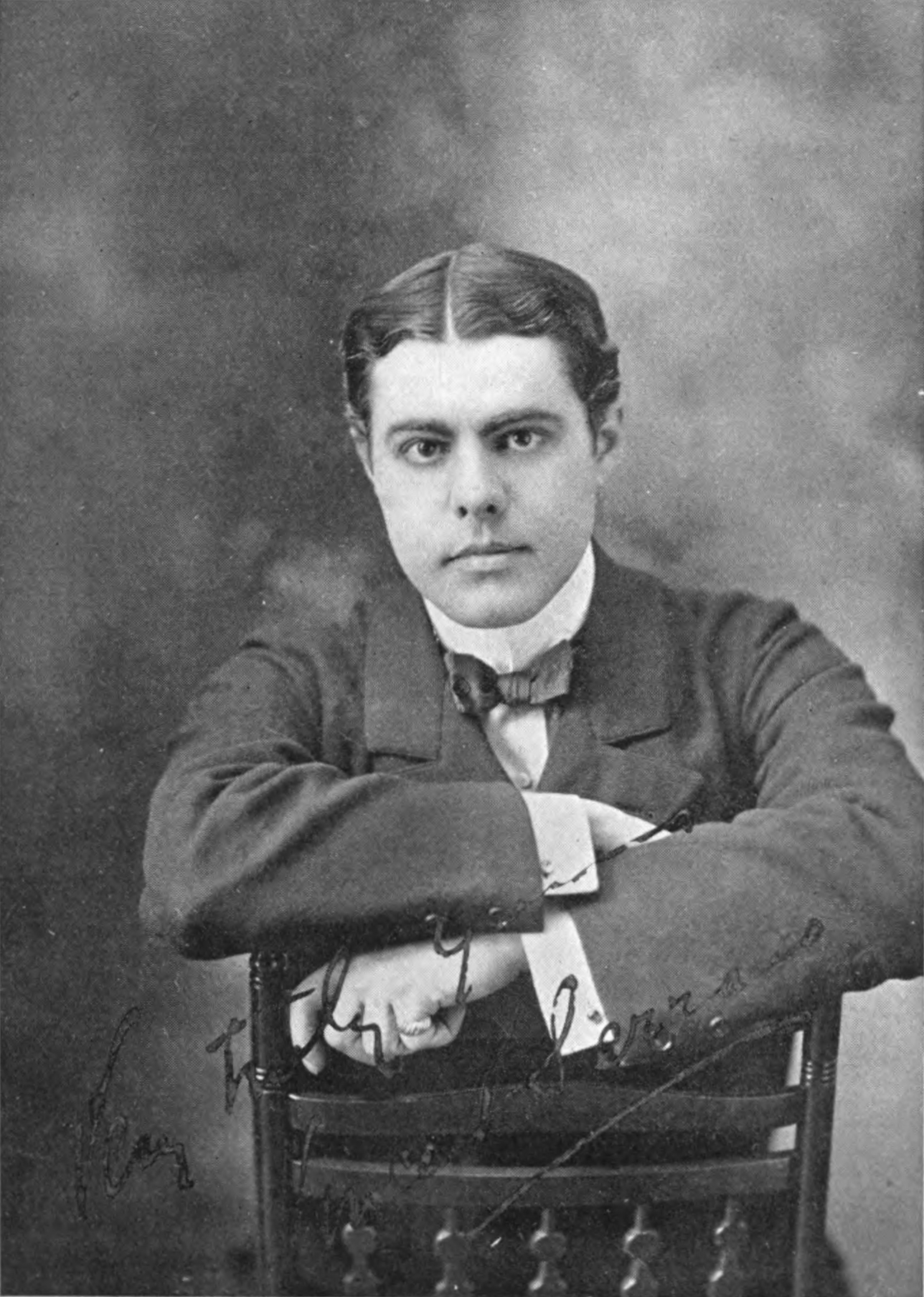
- Serrano c. 1901
- Born: February 17, 1866; New York City
- Died: January 11, 1935 (aged 68); New York City
- Occupation: Actor

Vincent Serrano (February 17, 1866 – January 11, 1935) was an American actor in plays and silent films.

== Biography ==
Serrano's best-known role was as Lieutenant Denton in the Augustus Thomas play Arizona, which had its New York opening in September 1900. He acted the role in over 1,000 performances. He also appeared in 13 movies, the last of which was 1927's Convoy. His last stage role was as General Esteban in the 1927 Broadway musical Rio Rita.

His mother was the translator Mary J. Serrano, wife of a South American government minister. He was buried at Sleepy Hollow Cemetery in Sleepy Hollow, New York.

== Partial filmography ==
- Lydia Gilmore (1915)
- A Modern Monte Cristo (1917)
- One Law for Both (1917)
- Eyes of Youth (1919)
- The Virtuous Model (1919)
- The Deep Purple (1920)
- Silk Husbands and Calico Wives (1920)
- The Branded Woman (1920)
- Convoy (1927)
