= Henry Serrano Villard =

Diplomat, author

Henry Serrano Villard (March 30, 1900 – January 21, 1996) was an American foreign service officer, ambassador and author. He served as United States Ambassador to Senegal and Mauritania from 1960-1961.

== Life ==
Henry S. Villard was born in Manhattan, New York City March 30, 1900. He was the great-grandson of William Lloyd Garrison, the prominent American journalist and abolitionist. He was the grandson of Henry Villard, the American railroad tycoon who commissioned the construction of the Villard Houses in Manhattan. His sister Mariquita Platov was a writer and pacifist.

As a teenager he served as a volunteer ambulance driver in Italy during World War I, becoming friends with Ernest Hemingway when both were patients in a Red Cross hospital in Milan. He graduated from Harvard in 1921, having been inducted into the Phi Beta Kappa honor society. During his years at Harvard he served as editor of The Harvard Crimson, the university’s student newspaper.

Henry Villard was married to Tamara Gringutes Villard (d. 1990) for 50 years. They had two children: Dimitri Villard and Alexandra Villard de Borchgrave, a writer and the wife of American journalist Arnaud de Borchgrave.

Villard died of pneumonia on January 21, 1996 in Los Angeles, California at the age of 95.

== Foreign service career ==
In 1928 Villard joined the United States Foreign Service and started his foreign service as vice consul in Tehran, Iran in 1928. In his capacity as an expert on Africa, he was a leader within the Department of State in the planning for the Allied invasion of North Africa during World War II. After that successful operation he served as the U. S. liaison to the Free French Forces in Africa.

In 1952 President Truman appointed him as the first United States Ambassador to Libya, where he served until 1954. President Eisenhower sent him to Geneva in 1958 as the Representative of the United States to the European Office of the United Nations; he held that office 1958–60. President Eisenhower again called upon Villard in 1960 to fill the ambassadorial postings to the newly independent nations of Senegal and Mauritania, a dual posting to both nations while resident in Dakar, Senegal. Upon the completion of those missions in 1961, he retired from the foreign service.

== Author ==
Villard was the author of several books. He had a great interest in the early days of aviation and authored two books on the subject:

- Contact! The Story of the Early Birds, an account the first years of aviation up to the First World War, published by Bonanza Books 1968, ISBN 0-517-127202.
- Blue Ribbon of the Air: The Gordon Bennett Races, the story of the Gordon Bennett races for airplanes, published by Smithsonian Press, 1987, ISBN 0-87474-942-5.

Another book was inspired by his experience recuperating from combat wounds suffered while a volunteer ambulance driver in Italy during World War I, observing firsthand the relationship of hospital roommate Ernest Hemingway and their nurse, Agnes von Kurowsky:

- Hemingway In Love And War: The Lost Diary of Agnes von Kurowsky, Her Letters, and Correspondence of Ernest Hemingway.

Kurowsky is the inspiration for the nurse in A Farewell to Arms. Villard's book, coauthored with James Nagel, is the basis for the 1996 film In Love and War.

Other works include:

- Looping the Loop: Posters of Flight
- The Great Road Races, 1894-1914
- Affairs at State: A career diplomat's candid appraisal of the U.S. Foreign Service
- Lincoln on the Eve of '61: A Journalist's Story
- Libya: The New Arab kingdom of North Africa
- Memoirs of Henry Villard, Journalist And Financier, 1835-1900
- The Past and Present of the Pike's Peak Gold Regions
- The Royal Victoria Hotel

Diplomatic posts
Preceded by New office	United States Ambassador to Libya; 1952–1954	Succeeded by John Lindsley Tappin
Preceded by New office	United States Ambassador to Senegal; 1960–1961	Succeeded by Philip Mayer Kaiser
Preceded by New office	United States Ambassador to Mauritania; 1960–1961	Succeeded by Philip Mayer Kaiser
