= Oswald Garrison Villard Jr. =

American professor of electrical engineering

- Born: September 17, 1916; Dobbs Ferry, New York, US
- Died: January 7, 2004 (aged 87); Palo Alto, California, US
- Education: Yale University (BA); Stanford University (PhD)
- Spouse: Barbara "Bobbie" Slater Letts (died 1996)
- Children: 3
- Scientific career
- Fields: Electrical engineering
- Workplaces: Stanford University
- Doctoral advisor: Frederick E. Terman

Oswald Garrison "Mike" Villard Jr. (September 17, 1916 – January 7, 2004) was an American professor of electrical engineering at Stanford University.

== Early life ==
Villard was born in Dobbs Ferry, New York, to a distinguished family. He was the great-grandson of William Lloyd Garrison, the famed abolitionist, and the grandson of Henry Villard, owner of the New York Evening Post and The Nation, who financed the work of Thomas Edison. His father was Oswald Garrison Villard Sr., owner of Post and The Nation, a prominent pacifist and civil rights activist.

He became interested in electricity after he was given "Harper's Electricity Book for Boys"; when he was 12, the family chauffeur gave him a radio assembled from a kit. He initially attended Buckley School in New York City, and later went to The Hotchkiss School in Lakeville, Connecticut. Villard received his bachelor's degree in English literature from Yale University in 1938, and entered Stanford as a graduate student in electrical engineering. After World War II interrupted, he returned to Stanford in 1947 and received his doctorate in 1949.

== Academic career ==
In between his degrees, Villard worked first as a research associate 1939-1941 and instructor 1941-1942 under Professor Frederick Terman at Stanford, then at Harvard University's Radio Research Laboratory, designing electronic countermeasures; he also worked with William Hewlett during this time. By 1955, he was a full professor at Stanford, a position which he held until retirement in 1987. His Ph.D. students included Mac Van Valkenburg and Kung Chie Yeh. In 1947, one of his first inventions was a radio transmitter that allowed simultaneous two-way communication (such as in a phone conversation).

At Stanford, Villard used radar to study electrical disturbances in the upper atmosphere caused by meteor trails, nuclear explosions, and rocket launches. His most famous work may be his 1959 efforts in over-the-horizon radar, which worked by reflecting high-frequency radar from the ionosphere.

In 1969, when Stanford University ceased classified work due to student protests, Villard moved his group to Stanford Research Institute (SRI), where he developed stealth technologies to counteract radar and sonar. In the 1980s, he developed small antennas that could receive jammed transmissions, allowing many people to receive the Voice of America radio program, especially after the Tiananmen Square protests of 1989. After his official retirement in 1987, he continued to assist with students' doctoral degrees at Stanford and worked part-time at SRI.

== Memberships and awards ==
Villard was a member of the National Academy of Sciences and the National Academy of Engineering, and a fellow of the Institute of Electrical and Electronics Engineers (IEEE), the American Association for the Advancement of Science, and the American Academy of Arts and Sciences. He served as a member on the U.S. Air Force Scientific Advisory Board (1961–75) and the Naval Research Advisory Committee (1967–75), which he chaired from 1973 to 1975.

His awards include the 1957 IEEE Morris N. Liebmann Memorial Award from the Institute of Radio Engineers, Meritorious Civilian Service Award from the Department of the Air Force, Secretary of Defense Medal for Outstanding Public Service, and the IEEE Centennial Medal in 1984. Stanford has established a graduate student fellowship in his name.
