= Robert Bosch Foundation Fellowship Program =

Program to promote German-US ties

The Robert Bosch Foundation Fellowship Program was a German educational fellowship for students from the US. It was established in 1984 to promote closer US-German ties. It was fully funded by the Robert Bosch Foundation (German: Robert Bosch Stiftung), one of the largest foundations in Germany but the program ceased in 2021.

== Overview ==
Each year some 15 to 20 young professionals from the United States were accepted through a competitive application process to take part in the program for a period of 9–12 months. The primary components of the Bosch Fellowship included high-level work placements at private, governmental, and non-governmental institutions in Germany, as well as intensive seminars on contemporary German issues. During seminars, Bosch Fellows met with key decision-makers from the public and private sectors throughout Germany and Europe. Participants in the Bosch Fellowship were recruited from business administration, journalism, law, public policy, and closely related fields. No German language skills were required at the time of application, and intensive German language study was offered before the start of the fellowship.

The Bosch Fellowship involved the following for participants:

- Two high-level work phases at institutions in Germany including in federal and local governments, private corporations, media outlets, and NGOs;
- Three seminars across Europe, each lasting several weeks that address German, European, and transatlantic issues;
- A monthly stipend; currently EUR 3,000 from September through May, with a smaller stipend during the summer language training
- Health, accident, and liability insurance;
- Financial support for an accompanying spouse and children, including 50% of travel costs, supplemental living stipend, health insurance, and limited funding for language training;
- Accommodation and roundtrip travel for orientation program in Washington D.C.;
- Transatlantic flight and seminar travel throughout Europe;
- Generous funding for language training in the U.S. and Germany before the program start;
- Membership in active Robert Bosch Foundation Fellowship Alumni Association with over 480 members.

Through this fellowship program, the Robert Bosch Stiftung aimed to contribute to the growth of German-American relations.

Cultural Vistas acts as the U.S. representative and has administered this professional fellowship in Germany since its inception in 1984.

== Notable alumni ==
- Denis McDonough, White House Chief of Staff
- Christopher A. Kojm, former Chairman, United States National Intelligence Council
- Adam Posen, economist, president of Peterson Institute for International Economics
- Gayle Tzemach Lemmon, journalism, senior fellow at Council on Foreign Relations
- Anne C. Richard, Assistant Secretary of State for Population, Refugees, and Migration
- Sandi Peterson, Group Worldwide Chairman, Johnson & Johnson
- Daniel Mudd, former President & CEO of Fannie Mae
- Christine A. Elder, U.S. Ambassador to Liberia
- Philip H. Gordon, diplomat & foreign policy expert, senior fellow at Council on Foreign Relations
- Markos Kounalakis, journalist
- Mary Wiltenburg, journalist
- Connie Moran, Mayor of Ocean Springs, MS
- Peter Laufer, journalist
- James Kirchick, journalist
- James Freis, global fraud expert and former Director of the Financial Crimes Enforcement Network (FinCEN)
- Jennifer Morgan, climate policy expert, former executive director of Greenpeace
