= Markos Kounalakis =

American journalist (born 1956)

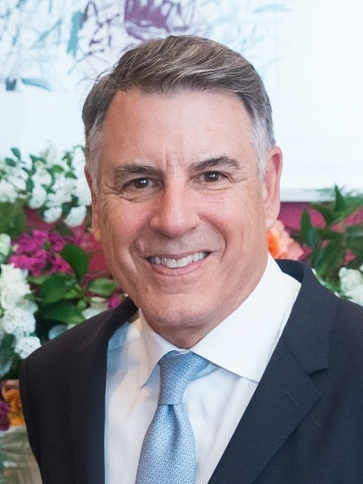
- Kounalakis in 2023

Second Partner of California
- Incumbent
- Assumed office January 7, 2019
- Lieutenant Governor: Eleni Kounalakis
- Preceded by: Jennifer Siebel Newsom (as Second Lady)

Personal details
- Born: December 1, 1956 (age 69) San Francisco, California, U.S.
- Spouse: Eleni Tsakopoulos (m. 2000)
- Children: 2
- Education: University of California, Berkeley (BA); Columbia University (MSc); Central European University (PhD)

Markos Kounalakis (Greek: Μάρκος Κουναλάκης; born December 1, 1956) is an American syndicated journalist and scholar who is the second partner of California as the husband of lieutenant governor Eleni Kounalakis. (Note: The role of second gentleman was renamed second partner to be gender inclusive.) He writes a syndicated weekly foreign affairs column for The Miami Herald and McClatchy-Tribune News and is a frequent foreign affairs analyst for CBS News and CNN International.

Kounalakis is a visiting fellow at the Hoover Institution and a senior fellow at the Center for Media, Data, and Society at Central European University in Vienna, Austria.

== Early life and education ==
Kounalakis was born on December 1, 1956, in San Francisco to Greek immigrants. His mother Vasiliki Rozakis, was born in Chania, Crete, the largest Greek island. His father, Antonios Markos Kounalakis, was an underground guerrilla fighter against the Nazis on the island of Crete during World War II; he fought with Constantine Mitsotakis, who later became Prime Minister of Greece. Antonios and Vasiliki arrived in the United States as beneficiaries of the displaced persons refugee program and sponsored by the World Council of Churches.

Kounalakis received a public education in the San Francisco Bay Area and earned his bachelor's degree in political science at the University of California, Berkeley in 1978. He received his MSc in journalism from Columbia University in 1988. Kounalakis earned a PhD in international relations/political science from the Central European University in Vienna, Austria, in 2016.

In 1988-1989, Kounalakis was a Robert Bosch Foundation fellow in Europe, attending the Bundesakademie für öffentliche Verwaltung in Bonn, Germany in 1988 and the École Nationale d'Administration in Paris, France in 1989. In 1995-1996, Kounalakis was an International Journalism Graduate Fellow at the University of Southern California and El Colegio de México in the capital Mexico City. As an international journalism graduate fellow, he also spent time in Guatemala (1995) and Cuba (1996). In the early 1980s, he attended the International Graduate School at Stockholm University, Sweden, where he studied international relations.

== Career ==
=== Academics ===
Between 2003 and 2009, Kounalakis was a regular Hoover Institution Media Fellow and has been a visiting fellow at the Hoover Institution at Stanford University since September 2013. Since 2010, he has been a Senior Fellow at the Center for Media, Data and Society at Central European University. In 2017, he became a Senior Research Fellow at the University of Oregon-UNESCO Crossings Institute for Intercultural Dialogue and Conflict Sensitive Reporting.

=== Journalism ===
Kounalakis is president and publisher emeritus of the Washington Monthly. In 2002, The New York Times called him a "White Knight" for saving Washington Monthly magazine. Publisher Kounalakis and editor Paul Glastris have since rejuvenated the magazine, grown its readership.

Along with Ray Suarez, he co-hosts the WorldAffairs podcast and syndicated radio program. He co-anchored with Peter Laufer the nationally syndicated weekly political program, Washington Monthly on the Radio. In 2019, he won a SPJ Sunshine State Award for his foreign affairs commentary and criticism.

=== Service ===
Kounalakis was appointed by President Barack Obama to serve on the J. William Fulbright Foreign Scholarship Board. He has served on the board of visitors at the Columbia University Graduate School of Journalism; board of advisors at Georgetown College and the Wilson Council at the Woodrow Wilson International Center for Scholars.

He served as vice chairman of the board of advisors at the Southeast Europe Project at the Woodrow Wilson International Center for Scholars and was a trustee of the World Affairs Council of Northern California. He also chaired Internews Network from 2002 to 2004 and was vice chairman of the California State World Trade Commission from 2001 to 2003. In 2003, he chaired a multinational reconstruction conference in Athens. Since 2020, he has been a trustee of The Asia Foundation. In September 2024, he joined the International Advisory Council of GLOBSEC.

=== Technology ===
In 1995, Kounalakis became the executive producer for Visible Interactive, a start-up technology company that used Newton handheld devices for immersive interpretive experiences in venues like the Smithsonian Institution museums. He later became the executive communications strategist at Silicon Graphics.

== Views ==
=== Russia - a state sponsor of terror ===
Kounalakis was an early outspoken critic of Vladimir Putin's authoritarian turn. Following the downing of Malaysia Airlines flight 17 and killing of 298 people in July 2014, he stated that "Russia is now clearly a state sponsor of terror."

His many columns identified Putin’s ambitions and warned that the Russian president’s unchallenged killings at home as well as extraterritorial aggression and murders would increase in frequency and scale. In 2018, Kounalakis asserted that Putin used Russia’s oil and gas as a strategic weapon against the West and that “instead of punishing bad behavior, however, the world has both financially rewarded Putin and shown him new incentives to continue his aggression — both at home and in Ukraine.”

=== Ukraine & nukes ===
Ukraine’s vulnerability to Russian aggression was called out in his multiple columns identifying Kyiv’s deterrence weakness as well as threats to global nuclear disarmament He argued that “the U.S., NATO and others must do what it takes to prove a nation like Ukraine can remain sovereign even though it gave up weapons of mass destruction.

=== Energy security ===
In 2019, after a strong electoral showing by Germany’s Green Party Kounalakis wrote that the party’s antipathy to nuclear energy and coal plants was a laudable environmental move but put the country – and Europe – in a vulnerably dependent position regarding energy security.

=== China - Opium war & fentanyl ===
In 2017, Kounalakis identified early that fentanyl was a cheap and lethal street drug and cutting agent emanating from China, strategically targeting vulnerable American citizens. He characterized this as a People's Republic of China's chemical attack on the United States and wrote that this deployment and non-kinetic warfare tactic was "China's 21st century Opium War against America".

=== Spin Wars - FARA & CCTV/CGTN/RT ===
Kounalakis's 2018 book, "Spin Wars & Spy Games: Global Media and Intelligence Gathering" (Hoover Institution Press) warned open systems and democratic societies that Russian and Chinese global media organizations use their foreign bureaus as both diplomatic outposts and spy nests. Russia Today (RT), China Global Television Network (CGTN), and Xinhua were organizations he suggested be registered under the U.S. Foreign Agents Registration Act (FARA). His book provided the data, insights, and policy prescriptions supporting this policy.

=== $100 bill ===
Following Russia's invasion of Ukraine, Kounalakis wrote in The Wall Street Journal that the United States should "Immediately stop circulating and honoring $100 bills in Russia" in order to foment discontent amongst average Russians, who hold the currency as security. His recommendation was also intended to harm international drug cartels.

=== California ===
Kounalakis argues that California, despite being the most populous and economically influential state in the U.S., is significantly underrepresented in shaping foreign policy in Congress. He highlights the absence of Californians on key Senate committees such as Armed Services, Foreign Relations, and Intelligence, which are crucial for foreign policy decisions.

== Personal life ==
Kounalakis married Eleni Tsakopoulos in Istanbul, Turkey in 2000. The couple has two sons. His wife served as the U.S. Ambassador to Hungary until 2013 and won her election in 2018 and her re-election in for Lieutenant Governor of California, taking office in January 2019. She previously ran for California governor in 2026. Like his father, Kounalakis was a blue-collar construction worker who maintains his Class A heavy equipment truck drivers license.

== Published works ==
=== Books ===
- Freedom isn't Free: The Price of World Order (February 2022)
- Defying Gravity: The Making of Newton (1993)
- Beyond Spin: The Power of Strategic Corporate Journalism (with Drew Banks, 1999)
- Co-written with Peter Laufer, Hope is a Tattered Flag: Voices of Reason and Change for the Post-Bush Era (June 2008)
- Reflections 1980-82: Markos Kounalakis (October 2012)
- Spin Wars & Spy Games: Global Media and Intelligence Gathering (July 2018)
- Can Public Diplomacy Survive the Internet: Bots, Echo Chambers, and Disinformation (with Shawn Powers, May 2017)
- Chinese Influence & American Interests: Promoting Constructive Vigilance (Working Group member, November 2018)
- The Hard Truth About Soft Power (with Andras Simonyi, August 2011)

=== Film ===
- The War Prayer (short film, 2007)

== Notes ==
Honorary titles
Preceded by Jennifer Siebel Newsom as Second Lady	Second Partner of California; January 7, 2019 – present	Incumbent
