= Calexico (disambiguation) =

Calexico is a city California, United States.

Calexico may also refer to:

- Calexico (band), an American alternative country musical group named after the city in California
- ¡Calexico!, a 2011 book by Peter Laufer about the city
