= Glastris =

Glastris is a surname. Notable people with the surname include:

- Georgia Glastris (born 1992), American-born Greek figure skater
- Paul Glastris (fl. 1977), American journalist and political columnist
