= Terry Phillips =

American journalist

Terry Phillips is an American journalist, author and media consultant. As a foreign correspondent, he covered events around the world for CBS News, and reported regularly for NPR, MonitoRadio and the NBC/Mutual Broadcasting System. Phillips was a contributor to the Hellenic Journal. He also provides analysis for such publications as the San Francisco Chronicle and The Bakersfield Californian. For ten years, he co-hosted the Armenia Fund global telethon.

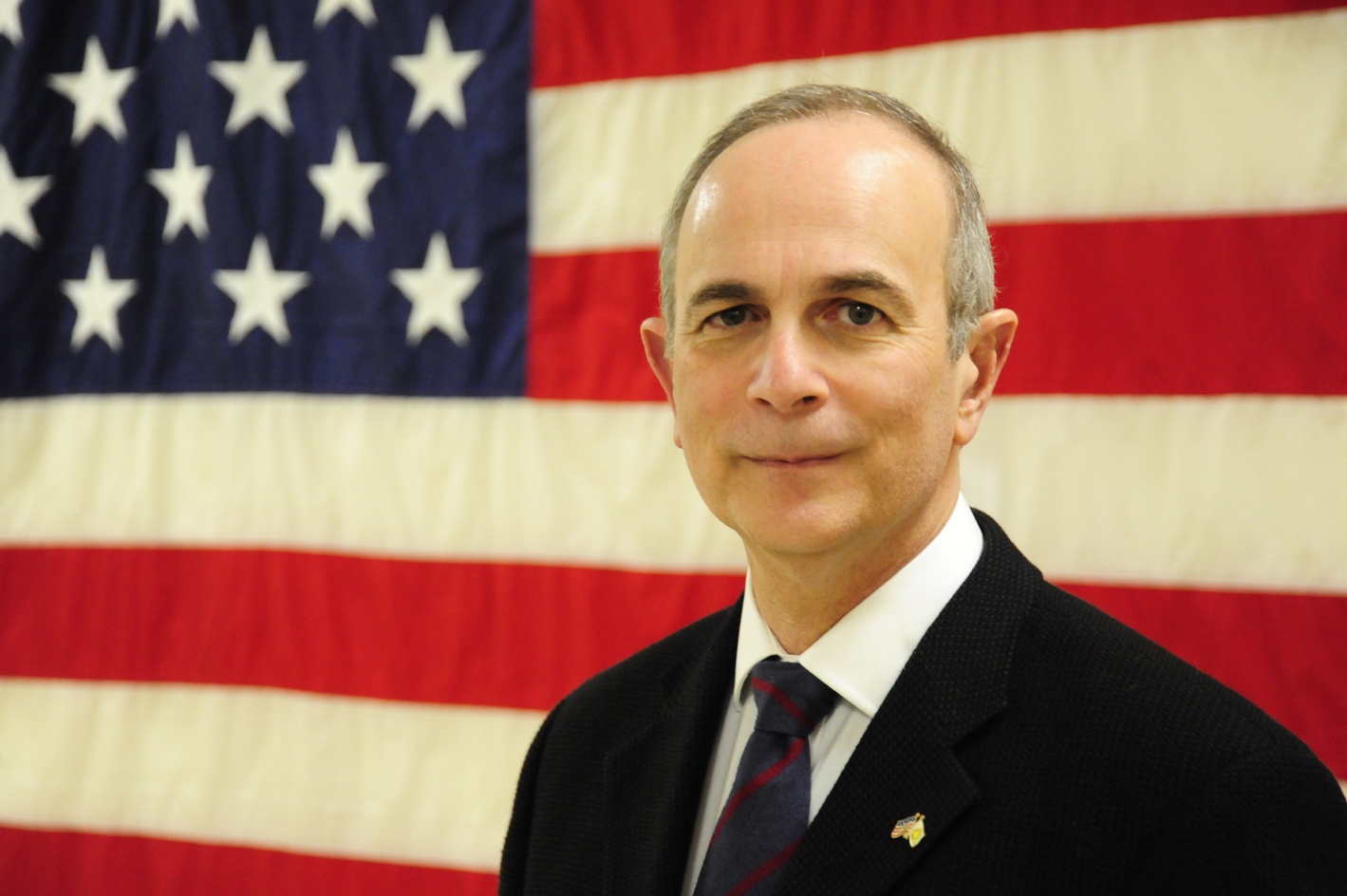
Phillips in 2012

== Early career ==
In 1976, Phillips began working at KTEH, the public television affiliate in Silicon Valley. He ran the station's video services department. He produced feature stories and presented documentary reports for such programs as “Tomorrow/Today,” an innovative science and technology magazine series on PBS.

Phillips operated the public access television station for Gill Cable TV in 1977.

== Network news reporting ==
Prompted by the 1988 earthquake in Armenia, Phillips traveled to the Soviet Union and began reporting for NBC/Mutual radio. He was one of the first journalists to cover fighting in the Caucasus region of Nagorno-Karabakh and the border war between Armenia and Azerbaijan.

Following the 1990 Iraq invasion of Kuwait, Phillips reported the first Gulf conflict from Baghdad. He re-located to Moscow to cover the collapsing USSR and was dispatched to Afghanistan, Somalia, Bosnia-Herzegovina and Haiti.

== Omnipoint ==
Phillips left daily news reporting in 1996 and entered the world of high technology. He was hired as public affairs director for Omnipoint Communications, a GSM wireless service provider. In that capacity, he also served as an international advocate for the GSM Association, a London-based trade organization for the world's wireless operators. While at Omnipoint, Phillips led the department dealing with company communications, media relations and public affairs. He was a member of the President's Council and published Wireless Etiquette (Omnipoint Books, 1999), the world's first guide to the polite use of instant communications devices, which was written by Peter Laufer. He was a champion of wireless security, challenging claims that GSM conversations were vulnerable to eavesdropping. In 1999, Omnipoint merged with VoiceStream Wireless (now part of T-Mobile).

== Murder at the Altar ==
Phillips moved back to California in 2000. He began a five-year investigation into the assassination of Ghevont Tourian, the Armenian Archbishop who was stabbed to death in a New York City church on Christmas Eve Sunday morning in 1933, an event which continues to divide Armenians worldwide. That research led Phillips to write a historical novel, Murder at the Altar (Hye Books, 2008). An anonymous letter to the editor of the Asbarez newspaper called Phillips “an agent of discord” A panel discussion of this topic took place at the National Association for Armenian Studies and Research (NAASR) in Belmont, Mass.

== Valley Public Radio ==
In 2005, Phillips returned to his birthplace, and for five years he hosted “Quality of Life,” an interview/news talk series on Valley Public Radio, the NPR stations in Central California. In June 2009, he broadcast the program live from Yerevan, Armenia.

In February 2011, during a series of scandals involving NPR, Phillips wrote an op-ed published in The Fresno Bee and the Bakersfield Californian, critical of financial influences on news content. A week later, he was fired. This prompted public reaction from listeners.

Phillips is the author of Off the Air: Thoughts About Our Quality of Life (Hye Books, 2011), a compilation of his radio commentaries.

== Congressional campaign ==
In November 2011, Phillips announced that he had formed an exploratory committee to run for Congress in the newly redistricted 23rd congressional district in the U.S. House of Representatives. He became an official candidate on March 9, 2012 challenging incumbent Rep. Kevin McCarthy. He came in second in the June 5 primary election, assuring him a spot on the November 6 runoff ballot. A newcomer to electoral politics, Phillips ran with no party affiliation. He garnered more than 57,000 votes — nearly 27 percent of the total.
