= Charles Peters =

American journalist, editor, and author (1926–2023)

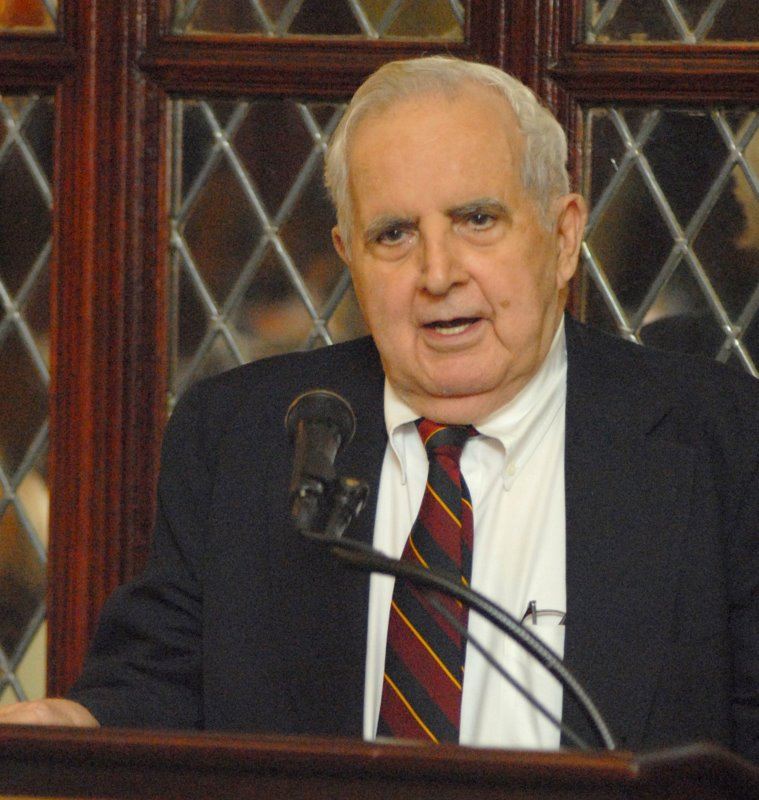
- Peters in 2008
- Born: Charles Given Peters Jr. December 22, 1926; Charleston, West Virginia, U.S.
- Died: November 23, 2023 (aged 96); Washington, D.C., U.S.
- Education: Columbia University (BA, MA); University of Virginia School of Law (JD)
- Occupations: Journalist; editor; author; politician
- Known for: Founding the Washington Monthly
- Political party: Democratic
- Spouse: Elizabeth Hubbell (m. 1957)
- Children: 1

Member of the West Virginia House of Delegates
- In office 1960–1962

Charles Given Peters Jr. (December 22, 1926 – November 23, 2023) was an American journalist, editor, and author. He was the founder and editor-in-chief of the Washington Monthly magazine and the author of We Do Our Part: Toward A Fairer and More Equal America (Random House, 2017). Writing in The New York Times, Jonathan Martin called the book a "well timed … cri de coeur" and "a desperate plea to his country and party to resist the temptations of greed, materialism and elitism."

== Early life and education ==
Charles Given Peters Jr. was born in December 1926 in Charleston, West Virginia. He attended public schools, graduating from Charleston High School in 1944. He enlisted in the U.S. Army in 1944, serving at Ohio University, Camp Atterbury in Indiana, and Fort McClellan, Alabama, where an injury in a training accident resulted in his being in Army hospitals for several months, and his discharge from the Army in 1946.

In 1946, he went to New York City to enter Columbia College. After receiving his BA in 1949, he entered graduate school at Columbia and received his MA. in 1951. In 1952–53, he worked for the J. Walter Thompson advertising agency in New York. During the summers from 1946 through 1954, he performed various backstage roles at summer theaters in Boylston, Massachusetts; Bucks County, Pennsylvania, and Newport, Rhode Island. He had his own repertory company in Charleston, West Virginia.

Peters entered the University of Virginia School of Law in 1954. He was named to the editorial board of the Virginia Law Review in 1955, serving until his graduation with a JD in 1957.

== Early career ==
Peters returned to Charleston to practice law with his father's firm, Peters, Merricks, Leslie and Mohler. His practice included libel, criminal defense, corporate and labor law, as well as representing plaintiffs and defendants in civil trials.

In 1959, he was named chief staff officer of the Judiciary Committee of the West Virginia House of Delegates, and in 1960, he was elected a member of the House. In 1960, he also managed the primary and general election campaigns in Kanawha County for presidential candidate John F. Kennedy. After serving in the 1961 session of the legislature, he went to Washington, D.C., to help start the Peace Corps. After returning to serve in the 1962 legislative session, he was named the Peace Corps' director of evaluation, a position that required him to report on the performance of the agency's programs overseas and on how they could be improved.

== Founding of the Washington Monthly ==
In 1968, Peters resigned from the Peace Corps to begin planning a new magazine to be called the Washington Monthly. The magazine's prospectus said its purpose would be "to look at Washington the way an anthropologist looks at a South Sea island," helping the reader understand our system of politics and government, where it breaks down, why it breaks down, and what can be done to make it work." The first issue was published in January 1969. Its articles included "The White House Staff vs. the Cabinet," "What Happens to a Senator's Day," and "The Data Game." Among the authors were such journalists as David Broder, Murray Kempton, Russell Baker, and Calvin Trillin, as well as people who had worked in government, such as Peters, former White House aide Bill Moyers, and former U.S. Senate aide James Boyd. A similar mix of authors would continue to write for the magazine, but beginning in 1970, the magazine became largely the product of young unknowns, who would typically serve as writer-editors for two years. Among them were Taylor Branch, Suzannah Lessard, James Fallows, Walter Shapiro, Michael Kinsley, David Ignatius, Nicholas Lemann, Gregg Easterbrook, Mickey Kaus, Joe Nocera, Jonathan Alter, Timothy Noah, Steve Waldman, Matt Cooper, Jason DeParle, James Bennet, Katherine Boo, and Jon Meacham.

Peters and the magazine have been characterized as important influences on neoliberalism and radical centrism.

Peters served as editor of the Washington Monthly until he retired in 2001, but continued to write a regular column Tilting at Windmills for the magazine until 2014. Russell Baker, in an interview in the alumni magazine Columbia College Today, called Peters "a great editor in an age that's not producing great editors."

== Founding of Understanding Government ==
In 1998, he founded a non-profit organization called Understanding Government with the purpose of improving press coverage of the executive branch of government. Understanding Government sponsored the first-ever Prize for Preventive Journalism, given in 2008 to journalist Michael Grunwald, and has published reports on federal agencies including the Federal Bureau of Investigation, the Federal Aviation Administration, and the Consumer Product Safety Commission. Peters retired from the nonprofit in 2012, and it ceased operations in 2014.

== Personal life, illness and death ==
In 1957, Peters married Elizabeth Hubbell, a former ballet dancer who had attended Vassar College. They had a son.

After several years of poor health due to heart failure, Peters died at his home in Washington, D.C. on November 23, 2023, at the age of 96.

== Books ==
Author

- We Do Our Part: Toward a Fairer and More Equal America
- Lyndon B. Johnson
- Five Days in Philadelphia: The Amazing 'We Want Willkie!' Convention of 1940 and How It Freed FDR to Save the Western World
- How Washington Really Works
- Tilting At Windmills: An Autobiography

Co-editor

- Blowing the Whistle (with Taylor Branch)
- The System (with James Fallows)
- The Culture of Bureaucracy (with Michael Nelson)
- A New Road for America: the Neoliberal Movement (with Phil Keisling)
- Inside the System (with Timothy Adams – first ed.; with John Rothchild – second ed.; with James Fallows – third ed.; with Nicholas Lemann – fourth ed.; with Jonathan Alter – fifth ed.)

== Articles ==
- A Neoliberal's Manifesto

== Awards ==
Peters was named the recipient of a number of awards over his career, including

- the first Richard M. Clurman Award in 1996 for his work mentoring young journalists.
- the Columbia Journalism Award in 1978 and was a Poynter Fellow at Yale University in 1980.
- the Carr Van Anda Award from the E. W. Scripps School of Journalism.

As well as his awards, he received a number of notable ceremonial appointments and positions, such as a visiting fellow at the Hoover Institution at Stanford University in 1994. In 2001, he was elected to the Hall of Fame of the American Society of Magazine Editors and the Hall of Fame of the D.C. Society of Professional Journalists. In 2002 he was the Times Mirror David A. Laventhol Visiting Professor at Columbia University's Graduate School of Journalism. He was a Public Scholar at the Woodrow Wilson International Center for Scholars, September 2002 through April 2003.

Preceded by Founding editor	Editor-in-chief of the Washington Monthly; 1969–2001	Succeeded by Paul Glastris
