= Hope Is a Tattered Flag =

Hope is a Tattered Flag: Voices of Reason and Change for the Post-Bush Era
- Author: Markos Kounalakis and Peter Laufer (foreword by Will Durst)
- Subject: The Post-Bush Era
- Publisher: Polipoint Press
- Publication date: 1 June 2008
- Media type: Print (Hardcover, paperback)
- Pages: 299 pp
- ISBN: 978-0-97948-225-0
- OCLC: 212627092
- Dewey Decimal: 973.93
- LC Class: E902 .K685 2008

Hope is a Tattered Flag: Voices of Reason and Change for the Post-Bush Era is a 2008 book by Markos Kounalakis and Peter Laufer, with a foreword by Will Durst. The book follows the answers Kounalakis and Laufer get when asking people where they go from here, now that George W. Bush has left office as the President of the United States. The foreword by Will Durst talks about his opinion of the Post-Bush Era.

== Overview ==
In a foreword by Will Durst, Durst discusses his opinion of the situation. Durst says that despite the fact he is glad to see George W. Bush leave office, he will miss the political cartoons and humorous commentary about what he calls "Mr. Bush's Reign of Error".

The rest of the book is a collection of interviews by Kounalakis and Laufer about what will become of the United States in the fields of changes, war, the military, oil, business, economics, the environment, immigration, ethics, news media, church, state, culture, and men and women after the terms of George W. Bush as President of the United States.

== Critical reception ==
Publishers Weekly said that Hope is a Tattered Flag was "unabashadly liberal", though it achieves its goal, which is "to offer ""satisfying and rich conversation"" that illuminates and unites."
