= Peter Laufer =

American journalist, broadcaster and documentary filmmaker

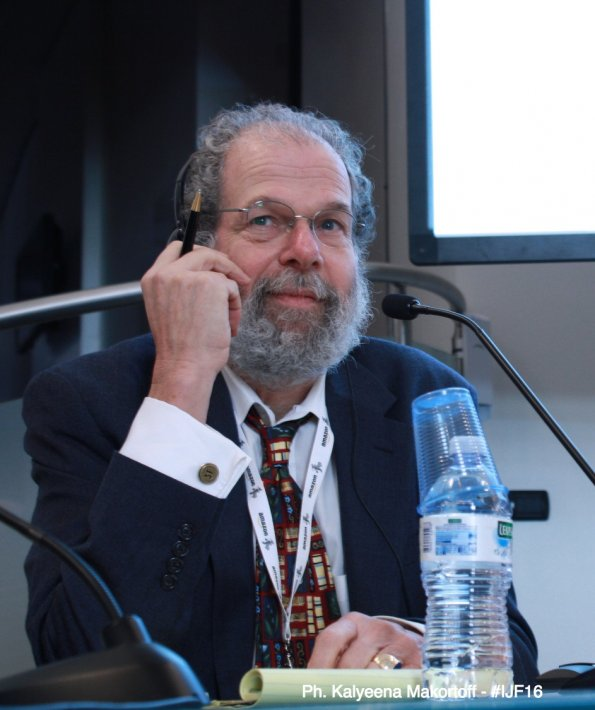
- Laufer in Perugia, Italy, 2016
- Occupations: Journalist; broadcaster; filmmaker

Peter David Laufer is an independent American journalist, broadcaster and documentary filmmaker working in traditional and new media. He is the James Wallace Chair in Journalism at the University of Oregon.

== Career ==
While a globe-trotting correspondent for NBC News, Laufer also reported, wrote, and produced several documentaries and special event broadcasts for the network that dealt with social issues, including the first nationwide live radio discussion of the HIV/AIDS epidemic. Healing the Wounds was an analysis of ongoing problems afflicting Vietnam War veterans. Hunger in America documented malnutrition in our contemporary society. A Loss for Words exposed the magnitude and impact of illiteracy in America. Cocaine Hunger was the first network broadcast to literally trace the drug from the jungles of Bolivia to the streets of America, and alerted the nation to the avalanching crises caused by the consumption of crack cocaine. Nightmare Abroad was a pioneering study of Americans incarcerated overseas.

Laufer's first major exposure to immigration issues dates to the Soviet invasion of Afghanistan in 1980, when he reported from Afghan refugee camps for NBC Radio. Almost 10 years later, as the Iron Curtain began to rise at the Berlin Wall, which he reported for CBS Radio, Laufer covered immigration from Western Europe, and from Mexico to the United States. In 2002, Laufer's documentary film, Exodus to Berlin, and the ensuing book of the same title, told the story of Germany's attempt to rebuild its Jewish population by providing sanctuary and financial support to Soviet-era Russian Jews who came over the border from Russia and Ukraine to Germany.

Laufer's books include The Question of Consent: Innocence and Complicity in the Glen Ridge Rape Case. It is the study of the rape of an intellectually disabled girl by a gang of her classmates, and the effect of the case on the health of the local community. Laufer has also written works on the fall of Communism in Europe (titled Iron Curtain Rising), a severe criticism of contemporary talk radio, Inside Talk Radio: America's Voice Or Just Hot Air, and a book version of the documentary about Americans in prisons overseas, Nightmare Abroad.

Another of his works, Made in Mexico, published by the National Geographic Society and illustrated by his sister Susan L. Roth, is a children's book about the cross-border issues between California and Mexico. Laufer has written Exodus to Berlin, a book version of his study of the resurgence of the Jewish population in Germany and the concurrent rise of right-wing violence, and Wetback Nation: The Case for Opening the Mexican-American Border. With Markos Kounalakis, he wrote Hope Is a Tattered Flag, based on conversations from Washington Monthly on the Radio, the nationally syndicated radio show they co-anchor. Another of their Washington Monthly projects is Calexico a series of radio documentaries celebrating the California-Mexico borderlands, and supported by a grant from the California Council for the Humanities. The research for that project developed into Laufer's book ¡Calexico!: True Lives of the Borderlines (published by the University of Arizona Press, 2011). Laufer questions the veracity of organic food provenance with his 2014 book Organic: A Journalist's Quest to Discover the Truth Behind Food Labeling (Lyons Press). Also published in 2014 was his Slow News: A Manifesto for the Critical News Consumer (Oregon State University Press).

His experiences with Mission Rejected resulted in a natural history trilogy: The Dangerous World of Butterflies, Forbidden Creatures, and No Animals Were Harmed During the Writing of this Book.

Peter Laufer was the charter anchor of the radio program National Geographic World Talk, a nationally syndicated show he created. He hosts The Peter Laufer Show Sundays, which originated on the Pacifica radio station KPFA, moved to the San Francisco Clear Channel station Green 960, and on to Sonoma County's KOWS-LP.

Laufer has also been a founding advisory board member of vildwerk. since 2022, a nonprofit organization inspiring conservation awareness through dance.

== Broadcast ==
Laufer took on his first radio job while in high school at one of the early all-talk radio station in America, Metromedia's KNEW in Oakland, California. (known at the time as Radio Free Oakland). From there he joined KSFO in San Francisco as a news writer while the self-proclaimed "World's Greatest Radio Station" was at its zenith.

In 1970, he joined KSAN (Jive 95). As a news reporter and talk show host at KSAN, he and other members of the KSAN "Gnus team" (as the news team called itself) won the DuPont/Armstrong Award for their unique coverage.

From KSAN, Laufer moved his talk radio act to KGO and its sister ABC-owned radio station in Los Angeles, KABC. Returning to the newsroom, he became part of NBC's News and Information experiment, an early test of a nationwide 24-hour radio news service. Based at the NBC-owned KNAI in San Francisco, he covered Northern California for NBC News in the mid-1970s.

He later worked at KPTL in Carson City, KOLO in Reno, and WFAA in Dallas before he returned to San Francisco and NBC to work as the "News Flash" at KNBR and a general assignment reporter at KYUU. Next, Laufer took over as news director at KXRX in San Jose where he also hosted a talk show.

Those KYUU reporting duties included foreign correspondence covering the Soviet invasion of Afghanistan and the U.S.-Soviet proxy wars in Central America. From KYUU he transferred to NBC News and was assigned to its Washington bureau where he worked for much of the 1980s as general assignment reporter and worldwide documentarian, winning several broadcast journalism awards.

Stopping off for a brief tour as news director of public radio station KQED in San Francisco, Laufer took a mid-career study fellowship in Berlin just prior to the fall of the Berlin Wall, and he covered the fall of the Soviet bloc for KCBS in San Francisco and the CBS radio stations nationwide, before switching to ABC Radio for further coverage of the post-revolutionary elections in Eastern Europe.

He returned to CBS to cover the run-up to the Gulf War and then moved back to Washington to take over as News and Program Director of the capital's news and talk radio station WRC. That experience led to his assuming the role of founding Programmdirektor of Newstalk 93.6 in Berlin, Germany's first American-style, German-language talk radio station. While in Berlin in the mid-1990s, he served as Germany bureau chief for the public radio business program Marketplace.

In Europe, he worked as consultant to Talk Radio 1395 in Amsterdam, training the staff for the launch of this first American-style, Dutch-language talk radio station. He consulted management and coached air staff at TalkRadio/talkSPORT in London, working with manager/owner Kelvin MacKenzie, the former editor of Rupert Murdoch's flagship British tabloid, the Sun. He consulted Bill Sinrich at TWI for their launch of the London television talk show Under the Moon, created for Channel Four, and he fielded a comparative study of German and American commercial television broadcasting for DuMont Funk und Fernsehen in Cologne.

Back in the United States, Laufer, with Managing Editor Terry Phillips, created the Omnipoint Business Minute, a daily business show sponsored by Omnipoint Communications as a branding vehicle for the launch of the mobile phone network that became T-Mobile. He reported on America with a weekly broadcast post card for Radio New Zealand. He established the Business Shrink daily business talk show with Peter Morris, which broadcast on Sirius Satellite Radio, the content of which became the Business Shrink book series published by Adams Media. With Mother Jones publisher Jay Harris he founded Mother Jones Radio, which broadcast nationwide on Air America affiliates. Along with Washington Monthly publisher Markos Kounalakis, he created and anchored Washington Monthly on the Radio, syndicated nationally and heard on its flagship outlet, XM Satellite Radio. He created National Geographic World Talk and the National Geographic Minute.

== Periodicals ==
Since founding the Sausalito Sun while in grammar school, Laufer has been immersed in print journalism. His other newspaper duties included working as the media critic in the early 1990s for SF Weekly and acting as editor-in-chief in the early 1970s of the resurgent Gold Hill News, bringing the classic Nevada newspaper back to the Comstock after a 92-year hiatus, a lapse he apologized for in a "note to readers" on the paper's front page that was flashed across the country on the wires of the Associated Press.

Laufer has written on the post-Communist scene in Prague and about the fate of Soviet-bloc spies for the San Francisco Examiner's Sunday magazine Image, and his feature articles have been published in periodicals such as Europe, Mother Jones, Hungry Mind Review, Washington Journalism Review, Kansas City Star, Fort Worth Star-Telegram, San Francisco Chronicle, and Prague-based Pozor magazine.

Laufer's op-ed pieces run the gamut from calling for the opening of the Mexican–American border to sounding post-9/11 wake-up calls regarding domestic attacks on Americans' civil rights. These essays have been published in papers including the Washington Post, the San Francisco Chronicle, and his hometown Marin Independent Journal.

For Penthouse magazine, Laufer's work included travel to Peru to interview Lori Berenson, training for survival in conflict zones with former British Marines, and investigating the predatory scam of selling bogus university degrees.

== Film ==
Laufer worked as reporter, writer, and producer of the documentary film, Exodus to Berlin with Jeff Kamen, which won the David Wolper best documentary prize at the Wine Country film festival in California. The project was supported by grants from the RIAS Berlin Commission and the Robert Bosch Foundation. He is reporter and cinematographer of the independent documentary Sea to Shining Sea, a portrait of immediate post-9/11 Middle America. His documentary Garbage, a biography of household trash, was broadcast on the San Francisco public television station KQED.

== Academic ==
Laufer did his undergraduate work in English at the University of California, Berkeley, he earned his Masters in Communications: Journalism and Public Affairs from the American University School of Communication in Washington, D.C., and his Ph.D. in Cultural Studies from Leeds Beckett University. His post-graduate work includes media studies while a Robert Bosch Fellow stationed at the Freie Universität in Berlin, German language study at the Carl Duisberg Centren in Cologne, French culture and politics study at the École nationale d'administration in Paris, and Spanish language study at the Academia Sonora lengua y cultura española in Macharviaya, Spain.

Laufer served on the faculty of Sonoma State University in California in the early 1990s, and he has taught journalists from Egypt, Cambodia, and Indonesia in the International Journalism and Media Management Training Program at Western Kentucky University. Under the auspices of San Francisco-based Media Alliance, he was instructor and coordinator of the Dateline: Prague seminar and workshop in foreign correspondence held in cooperation with the newspaper Prognosis in Prague and its twin program Dateline: Berlin held in cooperation with the Freie Universität in Berlin.

For Internews Networks and as a charter fellow of the Knight International Press Fellowship, he was dispatched to make an assessment of the Minsk Mass Media Center in Belarus. He conducted a field analysis of post-Fox media in Mexico for Internews, a project funded by the Packard Foundation.

A frequent speaker, Laufer's topics and venues include the Democracy Radio Forum in Washington, D.C., where he spoke on Why Right-wing Rhetoric and Ranting Dominate American Talk Radio, SENAC in São Paulo to discuss Media and the Third Sector, the RIAS Berlin Kommmission/Radio Television News Directors Association meeting in Berlin to detail Founding a Talk Radio Station in Berlin, and the World Affairs Councils in Portland and San Francisco to address the question: Are the Germans Still Dangerous?

Laufer has written the talk radio chapter Talk Nation: Turn Down Your Radio in the radio text Radio Cultures (edited by Boston College Communication Department professor Michael Keith) and the talk radio chapter Hier spricht Berlin: Newstalk 93.6 in the radio text Vox Populi: Hörerinnen und Hörer Haben das Wort, published by the Bundeszentrale für politische Bildung in Bonn.

Laufer participates in symposia such as the Sonoma State University Internet conference where he addressed Talk Radio as a False Community, the Radio-Television News Directors 48th Annual International Conference in Miami, where his theme was On the Beach, by Force or Choice. He spoke to the National Association of International Educators about The Media as International Affairs Educator and considered Talk Radio Democracy for the Peace and Justice Center of Marin County in California. At a University of California Graduate School of Journalism conference his criticized The Media's Coverage of the 1989 Earthquake.

== Fellowships ==
- Knight International Press Fellowship charter fellow, assigned to Minsk, Belarus, 1994
- Konrad Adenauer Foundation, journalists exchange program to Germany, 1993
- Headlands Center for the Arts, Sausalito, affiliate artist (writer), 1991–93
- The Robert Bosch Foundation Fellowship, research and study in Germany, 1988–89
- International Press Institute, journalist exchange program for study in Japan, 1983
- John J. McCloy Fellowship, American Council on Germany, research in Germany, 1982

== Honors and awards ==
- The California Council for the Humanities awarded The Calexico Project a radio production grant as part of its California Voices program 2008.
- Mission Rejected was awarded a Koerber Foundation (Hamburg) Transatlantic Idea prize in the foundations "Transitions in Life" competition 2006.
- RIAS Berlin Commission/ Radio Television News Directors Foundation 2000
- Gold Award for the book "Made in Mexico" (National Geographic, 2000), also cited on the Notable Social Studies Trade Books for Young People 2001 list, compiled by a joint committee of the Children's Book Council and the National Council for the Social Studies
- RIAS Berlin Commission/ Radio Television News Directors Foundation 1994
- German/American Production Grant for radio documentary: "Border Wars" 1994
- George Polk Award from Long Island University for reporting a documentary on Americans imprisoned overseas "Nightmare Abroad", which was also cited by the New York State and American Bar Associations 1985

== Books ==
- Don't Shoot the Journalist: Migrating to Stay Alive, 2025, Anthem Press, New York, NY ISBN 9781839994845
- Radio Vox Populi: Talk Radio from the Romantic to the Anglo-Saxon, 2022, Anthem Press, New York, NY ISBN 9781839987540
- Up Against the Wall: The Case for Opening the Mexican-American Border, 2022, Anthem Press, New York, NY ISBN 9781839985768
- Classroom 15: How the Hoover FBI Censored the Dreams of Innocent Oregon Fourth Graders, 2020, Anthem Press, New York, NY ISBN 9781785275975
- Dreaming in Turtle: A Journey Through the Passion, Profit, and Peril of Our Most Coveted Prehistoric Creatures, 2018, St. Martin's Press, New York, NY ISBN 9781250128096
- Organic: A Journalist's Quest to Discover the Truth behind Food Labeling, 2014, Lyons Press, Guilford, CT ISBN 978-0762790715
- Slow News: A Manifesto for the Critical News Observer, 2014, Oregon State University Press, OR ISBN 9780870717345
- Elusive State of Jefferson: A Journey Through The 51st State, 2013, TwoDot, Guilford, CT ISBN 978-0762788361
- No Animals Were Harmed: The Controversial Line Between Entertainment and Abuse, 2011, Lyons Press, Guilford, CT ISBN 978-0762763856
- Forbidden Creatures: Inside the World of Animal Smuggling and Exotic Pets, 2010, Lyons Press, Guilford, CT ISBN 978-1-59921-926-4
- The Dangerous World of Butterflies: The Startling Subculture of Criminals, Collectors, and Conservationists, 2009, Lyons Press, Guilford, CT ISBN 1-59921-555-1
- Calexico: True Lives of the Borderlands, 2011, The University of Arizona Press, Tucson, AZ ISBN 0-8165-2951-5
- Hope Is a Tattered Flag: Voices of Reason and Change for the Post-Bush Era (co-author with Markos Kounalakis), 2008, PoliPoint Press, Sausalito, CA ISBN 0-9794822-4-0
- Mission Rejected: U.S. Soldiers Who Say No to Iraq, 2006, Chelsea Green Publishing, White River Junction, VT ISBN 1-933392-04-5
- Wetback Nation: The Case for Opening the Mexican Border, 2004, Ivan R. Dee, Chicago, IL ISBN 1-56663-592-6
- Highlights of a Lowlife: The Autobiography of Milan Melvin (compiled and edited by Peter Laufer), 2004, Swan Isle, Bodega Bay, CA ISBN 1-892918-01-3
- Shock and Awe: Responses to War (edited and with an introduction by Peter Laufer), 2003, Creative Arts Book Company, Berkeley, CA ISBN 0-88739-602-X
- Exodus to Berlin: The Return of the Jews to Germany, 2003, Ivan R. Dee, Chicago, IL ISBN 978-1-56663-529-5
- Made in Mexico (illustrated by Susan L. Roth), 2000, National Geographic Society, Washington D.C. ISBN 978-0-7922-7118-5
- Wireless Etiquette: A Guide to the Changing World of Instant Communication, 1999, Omnipoint Books, New York, NY ISBN 1-892918-00-5
- Safety and Security for Women Who Travel (co-author with Sheila Swan Laufer), 1999, Travelers Tales, Palo Alto, CA ISBN 1-885211-29-5
- Inside Talk Radio: America's Voice or Just Hot Air?, 1995, Birch Lane Press, New York, NY ISBN 978-1-55972-278-0
- A Question of Consent: Innocence and Complicity in the Glen Ridge Rape Case, 1994, Mercury House, San Francisco, ISBN 1-56279-059-5
- When Hollywood Was Fun (collaborator with Gene Lester), 1994, Birch Lane Press, New York, NY ISBN 1-55972-197-9
- Nightmare Abroad: Stories of Americans Imprisoned in Foreign lands, 1993, Mercury House, San Francisco, CA ISBN 1-56279-028-5
- Iron Curtain Rising: A Personal Journey through the Changing Landscape of Eastern Europe, 1991, Mercury House, San Francisco, CA ISBN 1-56279-015-3
