= Eaton v. Federal National Mortgage Ass'n =

Eaton v. Federal National Mortgage Association
- Court: Massachusetts Supreme Judicial Court
- Full case name: Henrietta EATON vs. FEDERAL NATIONAL MORTGAGE ASSOCIATION & another.
- Argued: October 2011
- Decided: June 22, 2012
- Citation: 440 Mass. _____ N.E.2d ____(Mass. 2012)

Case history
- Prior action: ________ (Mass. Super. Ct. 2011)
- Subsequent action: none

Holding
- A foreclosing mortgagee (or its agent) must also hold the promissory note at the time of a foreclosure sale, but this only applies going forward from June 22, 2012

Court membership
- Chief judge: Roderick L. Ireland
- Associate judges: Margot Botsford, Fernande R.V. Duffly, Francis X. Spina, Ralph Gants, Barbara Lenk, Robert J. Cordy

Case opinions
- Majority: Margot Botsford

Laws applied
- Mass. Gen. Laws ch. 244 & 183

Eaton v. Federal National Mortgage Association is a 2012 opinion by the Massachusetts Supreme Judicial Court (SJC), which set a precedent about foreclosure defenses and attracted national attention.

== Case ==
The case involved a homeowner (Henrietta Eaton) who lost her house in Massachusetts via a foreclosure sale after defaulting on her mortgage. Eaton then filed a suit against Fannie Mae in Massachusetts Superior Court alleging that the record holder of the mortgage did not also hold the promissory note at the time of foreclosure. Due to this alleged lack of unity at the time of sale, Eaton was alleging that property title was invalid. In its opinion, the S.J.C. asserted that although the statutes and case law from the nineteenth century implied that the mortgagee should also hold the note at time of sale, the court would not apply the requirement of unity retroactively to June 22, 2012, but only prospectively from that date because the law was "ambiguous" and a retroactive application would have voided thousands of titles. Therefore, foreclosure notices after this date may only properly precede a sale if the mortgagee holds the promissory note or has an agent that holds the note on the mortgagee's behalf at the time of the notices of sale. This requirement may be proven through an affidavit.

== National attention ==
The Wall Street Journal reported that "[t]he Eaton case attracted national attention. Consumer advocates said that a ruling supporting Ms. Eaton would ensure due process for homeowners." The Obama administration's Federal Housing Finance Agency filed an amicus brief opposed to a retroactive requirement of unity of note and mortgage because it was purportedly a "direct threat to orderly operation of the mortgage market."

Businessweek quoted Professor Adam Levitin, one of the amicus filers, who reported that "for people who are currently in foreclosure or worried that foreclosure will happen in the future, this rule matters quite a bit."

The Boston Globe also quoted Professor Levitin, who stated that this "means that past foreclosures cannot be reopened because of this case, so the financial services industry just dodged billions in liability for wrongful foreclosures and evictions, and the title insurance industry did as well."
