= No Animals Were Harmed (book) =

2011 book by Peter Laufer

No Animals Were Harmed: The Controversial Line Between Entertainment and Abuse
- Author: Peter Laufer
- Cover artist: Georgiana Goodwin
- Series: Peter Laufer's untitled animal trilogy
- Subject: Animal abuse
- Publisher: Lyons Press
- Publication date: 18 October 2011
- Media type: Print (Hardcover)
- Pages: 272 pp
- ISBN: 978-0-76276-385-6
- OCLC: 711046040
- Dewey Decimal: 179/.3
- LC Class: HV4711 .L28 2012
- Preceded by: Forbidden Creatures

No Animals Were Harmed: The Controversial Line Between Entertainment and Abuse is a 2011 book by Peter Laufer. It is the third book in his untitled animal trilogy, following Forbidden Creatures in 2010 and The Dangerous World of Butterflies in 2009. The book explores what those who work with animals believe to be the line between using animals for entertainment purposes and abusing them. Meanwhile, the author recounts how his own opinions changed about that line when he talks to the different people about their beliefs.

== Overview ==
Peter Laufer talks to those who work with animals for various purpose, such as a self-taught lion tamer, a slaughterhouse owner, and a scientist who fights crickets as part of his job, and asks them when using an animal for the purpose of entertainment, food, or science becomes abusing the creature. Meanwhile, Laufer recounts his own experiences on this topic, such as a foray into veganism and looking at killing ants on the kitchen counter in a different light. Laufer also searches for a cockfight throughout the course of the book and examines laws on cockfighting in various places in the United States.

== Reception ==
Kirkus Reviews praised No Animals Were Harmed, calling it "provocative" and "compelling".

Booklist praised and recommended the book for young adult readers despite the fact that it was written for adult audiences because "The author's highly personal search will resonate with teens."
