= Forbidden Creatures =

2010 book by Peter Laufer

Forbidden Creatures: Inside the World of Animal Smuggling and Exotic Pets
- Author: Peter Laufer
- Cover artist: Georgiana Goodwin
- Series: Peter Laufer's untitled animal trilogy
- Subject: Wildlife smuggling, exotic pets
- Publisher: Lyons Press
- Publication date: 1 June 2010
- Media type: Print (Hardcover)
- Pages: 272 pp
- ISBN: 978-1-59921-926-4
- OCLC: 435418824
- Dewey Decimal: 364.1/3367
- LC Class: SK591 .L38 2010
- Preceded by: The Dangerous World of Butterflies
- Followed by: No Animals Were Harmed

Forbidden Creatures: Inside the World of Animal Smuggling and Exotic Pets is a 2010 book by Doctor of Philosophy Peter Laufer. It is the second book in his untitled animal trilogy, following The Dangerous World of Butterflies in 2009 and preceding No Animals Were Harmed in 2011. The book explores the lives of those that either own exotic animals or have been captured for illegally smuggling them, with a strong focus on Travis, the chimpanzee who attacked Charla Nash in 2009.

== Overview ==
Peter Laufer asks himself what animals are being smuggled and why they are being smuggled. He attempts to find a connection to the underworld of international animal smuggling and talks to the hunters, traders, breeders, and customers who contribute to the world of animal smuggling. In addition, he talks to those that have legally obtained permits to own exotic animals, such as a young Bengal tiger, and talks to those that work with animals about why Travis the chimpanzee would attack humans in the first place.

== Critical reception ==
Booklist praised and recommended the book for young adult readers despite the fact that it was intended for adult audiences because "This one is an obvious choice for the Animal Planet generation."
