= The Dangerous World of Butterflies =

Philosophical book

The Dangerous World of Butterflies: The Startling Subculture of Criminals, Collectors, and Conservationists
- Author: Peter Laufer
- Cover artist: Georgiana Goodwin
- Series: Peter Laufer's untitled animal trilogy
- Subject: Butterflies
- Publisher: Lyons Press
- Publication date: 5 May 2009
- Media type: Print (Hardcover, paperback)
- Pages: 288
- ISBN: 978-1-59921-555-6
- OCLC: 244418059
- Dewey Decimal: 595.78/9/075
- LC Class: QL542 .L38 2009
- Followed by: Forbidden Creatures

The Dangerous World of Butterflies: The Startling Subculture of Criminals, Collectors, and Conservationists is a 2009 book by Doctor of Philosophy Peter Laufer. It is the first book in his untitled animal trilogy, preceding Forbidden Creatures in 2010 and No Animals Were Harmed in 2011. The book explores the presence of the butterfly in the fields of organized crime, ecological devastation, species depletion, natural history museum integrity, and chaos theory.

== Overview ==
The Dangerous World of Butterflies has Laufer talking to butterfly experts, both professional and amateur, discussing the art, conservation, breeding, development, wing colors, and the meaning of its fascination for humans of the butterfly. He explores the various mysteries of lepidopterology, such as the process of metamorphosis. In addition, he discovers controversy in commercial butterfly breeding and discovers vast criminal operations involving the mass poaching and smuggling of butterflies.

== Critical reception ==
Kirkus Reviews had a mixed review of the book, saying that it was "charming but slightly scattershot" and "flawed but pleasing".

The Seattle Times compared The Dangerous World of Butterflies to The Orchid Thief, praising both and calling them "entertaining" and "enlightening".

Publishers Weekly said that The Dangerous World of Butterflies delivered an "absorbing science lesson" in what the reviewer called "casual prose".
