= Daniel Mudd =

American businessman

Daniel H. Mudd (born 1958) is the former president and CEO of Fannie Mae, a post he held from 2005 to 2008, and, more recently, the CEO of Fortress Investment Group for 2 1/2 years.

== Education and early career ==
Mudd holds a B.A. degree in American history from the University of Virginia and an M.P.A. from the John F. Kennedy School of Government at Harvard University. Mudd was an officer in the United States Marine Corps and was decorated for his combat service in Beirut. After a tour in the Office of the Secretary of Defense, he left the service to get his M.P.A.

Mudd has been an advisor to Asia-Pacific Economic Cooperation (APEC) and has served on boards of the Council on Foreign Relations, the National Building Museum, Hampton University, the Local Initiatives Support Corporation, the University of Virginia board of trustees, and the Sidwell Friends School.

Early in his career, Mudd held positions in financial services and management consulting at the World Bank, Ayers Whitmore and Company, and Xerox Corporation. Mudd later worked at GE Capital in International Financing, European Fleet Services, and Business Development. At GE Capital, he became vice president for Business Development in 1991, was managing director for International Financing from 1993 to 1995, and became president and CEO for European Fleet Services in 1995. From 1996 to 1999, he was president of GE Capital Asia-Pacific. Mudd was previously president and CEO of GE Capital Japan before he joined Fannie Mae in February 2000.

== Fannie Mae ==
In February 2000, Mudd became a director and vice chairman and chief operating officer at Fannie Mae. He remained chief operating officer until December 21, 2004. Mudd was named interim CEO of Fannie Mae in December 2004, after Franklin Raines stepped down when the U.S. Securities and Exchange Commission (SEC) found Fannie Mae had violated accounting rules. Mudd served as interim CEO of Fannie Mae until March 2005, and became the president and CEO of Fannie Mae on June 1, 2005.

Mudd was a director at Ryder System, Inc. from 2002 to 2007. In 2007, Mudd became a director at Fortress Investment Group. Forbes ranked Mudd 182nd in executive pay in 2005, 323rd in 2006, 337th in 2007, and 202nd in 2008.

== Subsequent career ==
For 2 1/2 years, until December 2011, Mudd was the CEO of Fortress, a hedge fund in New York City that has, among other investments, bought tax liens on delinquent property taxes from local governments.

== Personal life ==
He is the son of former TV anchorman Roger Mudd. His family is indirectly related to Samuel Mudd, the doctor who was imprisoned for aiding and conspiring with John Wilkes Booth after the assassination of Abraham Lincoln.

In 2000, he and his spouse purchased a historic property in Washington dating back to 1927. At the time, it was valued at $5.15 million. It was put back on the market in 2009.
