= ¡Calexico! =

2011 book by Peter Laufer

¡Calexico! True Lives of the Borderlands
- Author: Peter Laufer
- Subject: Mexico–United States border
- Publisher: University of Arizona Press
- Publication date: 1 September 2011
- Media type: Print (Hardcover)
- Pages: 248 pp
- ISBN: 978-0-8165-2951-3
- OCLC: 703623730
- Dewey Decimal: 979.4/99
- LC Class: F869.C14 L38 2011

¡Calexico! True Lives of the Borderlands is a 2011 book by Peter Laufer. It covers Laufer's encounters and experiences during his week-long stay in Calexico, California, a city on the Mexico–California border. He asks citizens there various questions about life on the border, such as what draws them to border towns and if "English-only" would be a realistic policy.

== Overview ==
¡Calexico! covers the events that Peter Laufer watches occur over one week spent in Calexico, California. Calexico and its adjacent sister city Mexicali are two cities that lie on the Mexico–California border. (Both the cities' names are portmanteaus of Mexico and California.) Laufer asks citizens of Calexico what draws them to border towns like Calexico and Mexicali, how they feel about border security and fences that may, at some point in the future, run through their very backyards, if "English-only" is a realistic policy, why some towns on the border have flourished while others have declined, and what it means to be Mexican or American in a place on the border.
