= Washington Monthly =

Bimonthly magazine covering U.S. politics and government

- Editor: Paul Glastris
- Frequency: Monthly (1969–2008), bimonthly (2008–2013), five times a year (2014-present)
- Circulation: 10,630
- Founder: Charles Peters
- First issue: February 19, 1969
- Country: United States
- Based in: Washington, D.C.
- Website: washingtonmonthly.com
- ISSN: 0043-0633

Washington Monthly is a bimonthly, (Note: As in once every two months.) nonprofit magazine primarily covering United States politics and government that is based in Washington, D.C. The magazine also publishes an annual ranking of American colleges and universities, which serves as an alternative to Forbes' and U.S. News & World Report's rankings.

== History ==
Charles Peters founded the magazine on February 19, 1969, and wrote the "Tilting at Windmills" column in each issue until 2014. Paul Glastris, former speechwriter for Bill Clinton, has been Washington Monthly's editor-in-chief since 2001.

Past staff editors of the magazine include Jonathan Alter, Taylor Branch, James Fallows, Joshua Green, David Ignatius, Mickey Kaus, Nicholas Lemann, Suzannah Lessard, Jon Meacham, Timothy Noah, Joe Nocera, Nicholas Thompson, and Steven Waldman.

In 2008, the liberal watchdog and advocacy group Common Cause considered acquiring Washington Monthly, but the deal fell apart.

== Contents and viewpoint ==
The politics of Washington Monthly are often considered center-left. Founder Charles Peters, who had long referred to himself as a New Deal Democrat, redefined himself as a neoliberal in the 1980s, becoming an early proponent of market-based reforms among Democrats. His columns also frequently emphasized the importance of a vigilant "fourth estate" in keeping government honest.

Washington Monthly features a continuing blog, "Political Animal", which was written principally by Kevin Drum for several years, with frequent guest contributions by Washington Monthly's current and alumni editors. In 2008, Steve Benen took over as lead blogger. In 2012, he was succeeded by Ed Kilgore. Kilgore left the magazine in 2015.

In addition to "Political Animal", the magazine's website hosts "Ten Miles Square", a general blog featuring posts from staff and political scientists, which debuted in 2011, and "College Guide", a blog about higher education, which the magazine began offering in 2009.

== College rankings ==
Washington Monthly's annual college and university rankings, a deliberate alternative college guide to U.S. News & World Report and Forbes College Rankings among domestic publications, began as a research report in 2005. It was introduced as an official set of rankings in the September 2006 issue.

Its "National Universities Rankings", most recently published in 2023, began as a research report in 2005 with its first rankings appearing in the September 2006 issue. Washington Monthly rates schools "based on their contribution to the public good in three broad categories: Social Mobility (recruiting and graduating low-income students), Research (producing cutting-edge scholarship and PhDs), and Service (encouraging students to give something back to their country)."

== Funding ==
The Washington Monthly receives financial support from the Lumina Foundation to provide coverage of post-secondary education-related issues. The magazine has also received funding from the Schumann Center for Media and Democracy, the Carnegie Corporation of New York, and individual supporters, including Warren Buffett and Markos Kounalakis.
