= Paul Glastris =

American journalist and political columnist

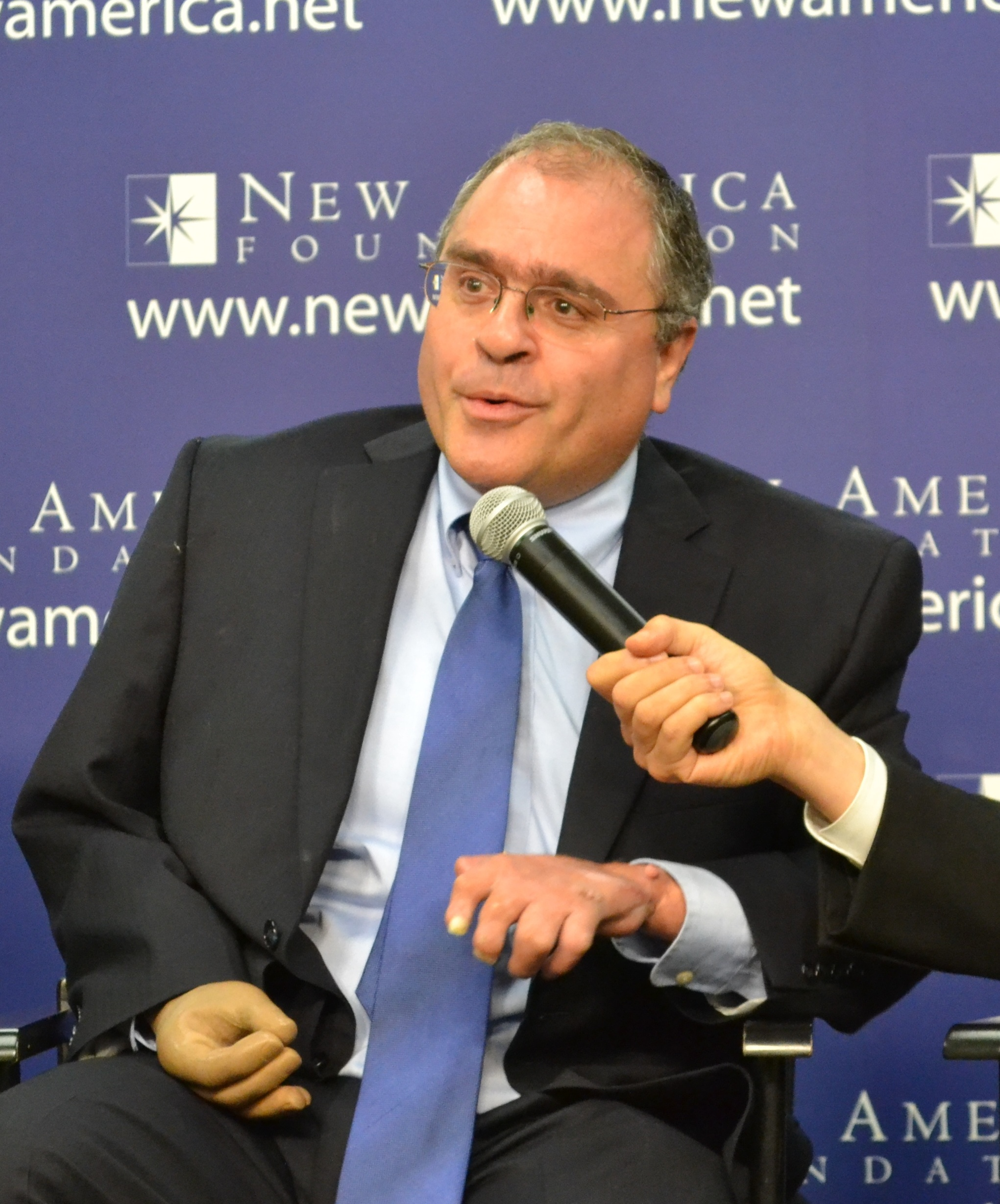
Paul Glastris (centre) at a New America Foundation event

Paul Glastris is an American journalist and political columnist. Glastris is the current editor-in-chief of the Washington Monthly and was President Bill Clinton's chief speechwriter from September 1998 to the end of his presidency in early 2001. Before 1998, Glastris was a correspondent for U.S. News & World Report.

== Early life and education ==
Glastris grew up in the St. Louis area with two brothers, Bill and George. His mother, Bess "Vasiliki" Dimpapas Glastri (1924-2018), was the daughter of Greek immigrant parents, and had a pioneering career at KWK Radio-TV in St. Louis before marrying William V. Glastris, Sr. His father owned a small company, Glastris-Manning/Courtesy Checks Advertising and Public Relations Group.

Glastris graduated from Parkway West High in Ballwin, Missouri, in 1977. He attended Northwestern University, graduating with a B.A. in history in 1981 and a M.A. in radio in 1982.

== Career ==
In 1984, Glastris was working for his father in the advertising business, when he decided to move to Washington, D.C. He found an unpaid internship, then a staff job at the Washington Monthly from 1985 to 1986. In 1987 he was a freelance writer in Washington.

From 1988 to 1998, Glastris was a correspondent and editor for U.S. News & World Report. Glastris covered the Midwest from U.S. News & World Report's Chicago bureau. He did this during two presidential campaigns, the Mississippi floods of 1993, and the rise of the Michigan Militia. From 1995 to 1996, he worked as Bureau Chief in Berlin, Germany where he was responsible for covering the former Yugoslavia in the final months of the Bosnia War. He also wrote stories while staying in Germany, Russia, Greece, and Turkey.

While working as a speechwriter for President Bill Clinton from 1998 to 2001, Glastris wrote drafts of more than 200 speeches on a variety of subjects such as education, health care, and the budget. He helped write the State of the Union addresses in 1999 and 2000. In 1999, Glastris traveled with President Clinton to Turkey and Greece and wrote the President's address to Greece. Glastris developed Clinton's "DC Reads this Summer" program. This program "put over 1000 federal employees as volunteer reading tutors in Washington, DC public schools." In 2000, he was also responsible for co-writing the President's address to the Democratic convention in Los Angeles.

Glastris has been the editor-in-chief of the Washington Monthly since 2001. He was a Bernard L. Schwartz Fellow at New America Foundation from 2008 to 2010, and is a senior fellow at the Western Policy Center in Washington, D.C.

== Personal life ==
Glastris was married to Kukula Kapoor Glastris, who died in August 2017; the two met in 1981, when Glastris was in graduate school. Kukula worked for U.S. News and later was books editor of the Washington Monthly. The couple had two children, Hope and Adam. Glastris and his family live in Washington, D.C.

Preceded by Charles Peters	Editor-in-chief of the Washington Monthly; 2001-present	Succeeded by Incumbent
