= Ads =

ADS or Ads may refer to:

- Advertising

== Arts and entertainment ==
- ADS (TV station), Adelaide, South Australia
- "Aiming Down Sights", video game term

== Aviation ==
- ADS, U.S. Navy air defense ship, an anti-aircraft ship; see List of hull classifications
- Air Defence Ship, Indian aircraft carrier designation
- Air defence system, anti-aircraft weapon
- Automatic dependent surveillance for tracking aircraft
- Addison Airport in Texas, US (IATA airport code ADS)

== Science and technology ==
=== Computing ===
- Advanced Design System, electronic design automation software
- Alternate data stream in Microsoft NTFS
- Automated decision support, rule-based systems for management

=== Military use ===
- Active Denial System, US non-lethal weapon
- ADS amphibious rifle

=== Other uses in science and technology ===
- Accelerator-driven system, a type of subcritical reactor
- Adaptive Damping System, Mercedes vehicle suspension
- Aitken Double Star Catalogue
- Anti–de Sitter space (AdS), a manifold in mathematics and physics
- Archaeology Data Service
- Astrophysics Data System
- Atmospheric diving suit
- Automated driving system
- Autonomous Detection System for biohazards

== Other uses ==
- Adamorobe Sign Language, Ghana
- Adelaide Dolphin Sanctuary, a dolphin sanctuary in Adelaide, South Australia
- ADS Group, a British trade organisation
- ADS (motorcycle), a Belgian manufacturer
- Advanced Drainage Systems, a US manufacturer of plastic pipes and other drainage products
- Alliance Data Systems, NYSE code
- American depositary share
- American Dialect Society, a learned society dedicated to languages in the US
- Apna Dal (Soneylal), an Indian political party
- Ardrossan Harbour railway station, North Ayrshire, Scotland, station code

== See also ==
- ADSS (disambiguation)
- AD (disambiguation)
