= Eleni Kounalakis =

American politician (born 1966)

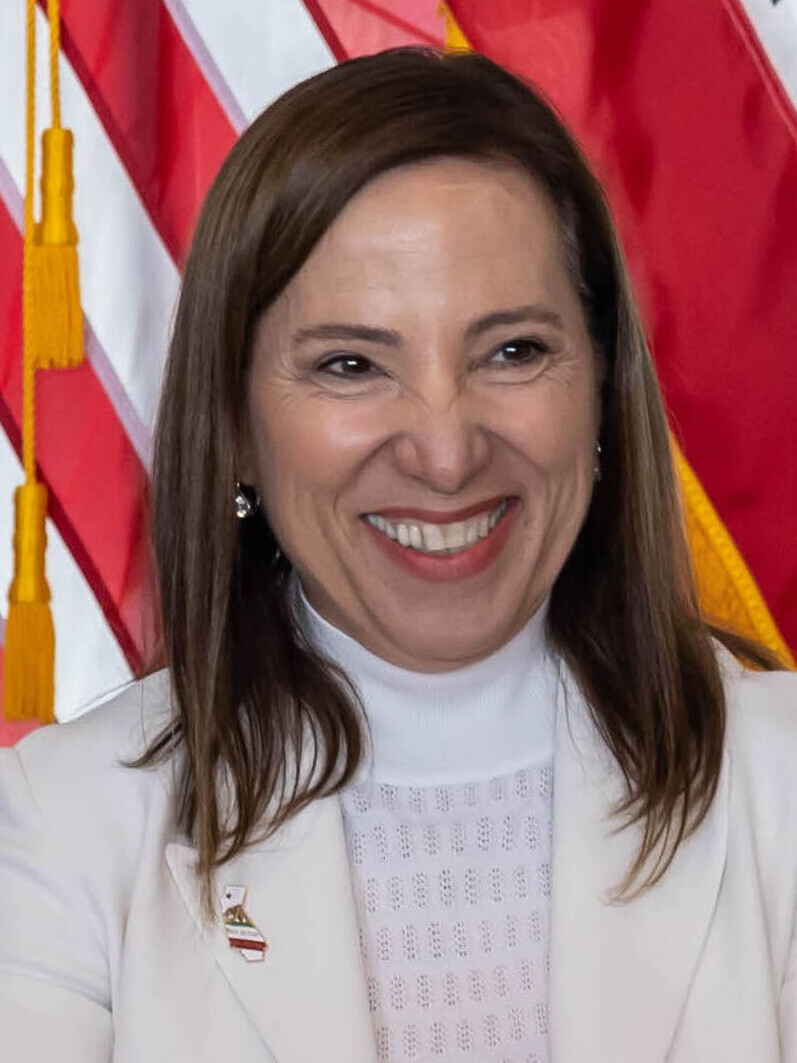
- Kounalakis in 2025

Treasurer-elect of California
- Assuming office January 4, 2027
- Governor: Xavier Becerra (elect)
- Succeeding: Fiona Ma

50th Lieutenant Governor of California
- Incumbent
- Assumed office January 7, 2019
- Governor: Gavin Newsom
- Preceded by: Gavin Newsom

United States Ambassador to Hungary
- In office January 11, 2010 – July 20, 2013
- President: Barack Obama
- Preceded by: April H. Foley
- Succeeded by: Colleen Bell

Personal details
- Born: Eleni Tsakopoulos; March 3, 1966 (age 60) Sacramento, California, U.S.
- Party: Democratic
- Spouse: Markos Kounalakis (m. 2000)
- Children: 2
- Relatives: Angelo Tsakopoulos (father); George Demos (brother-in-law)
- Education: Dartmouth College (BA); University of California, Berkeley (MBA)
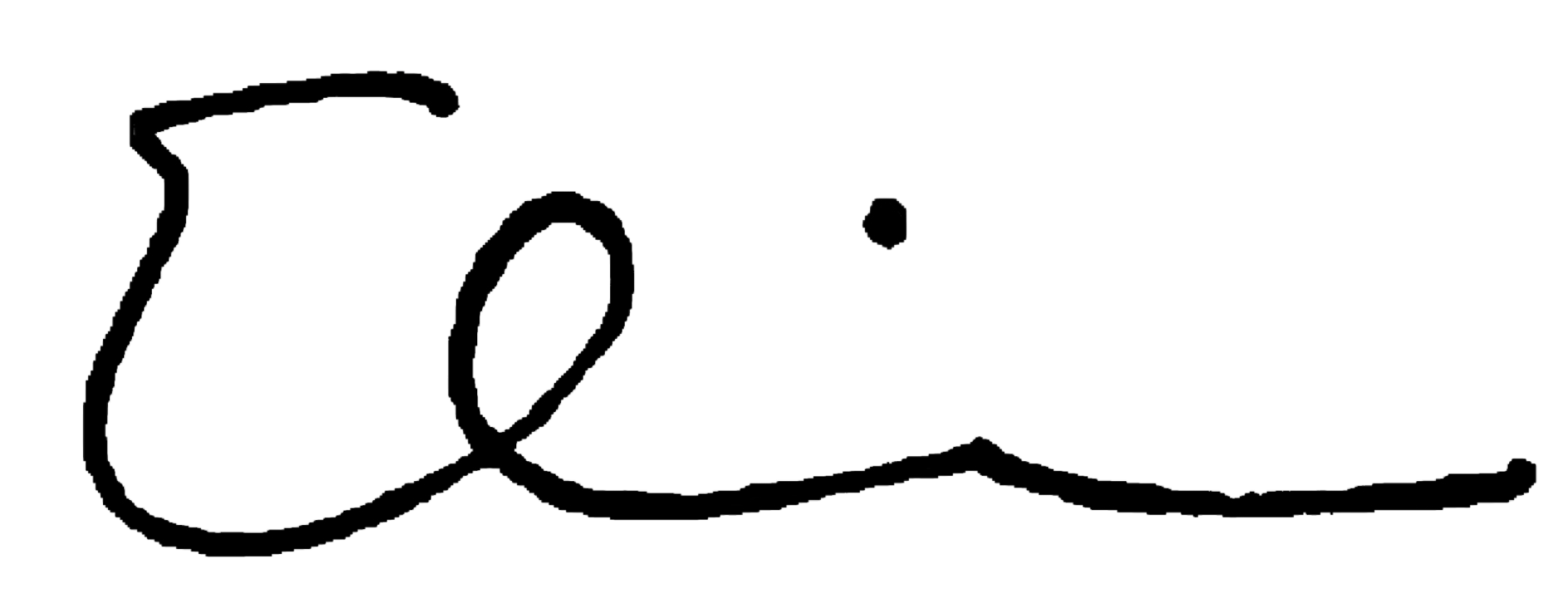
- Signature

Eleni Kounalakis (Note: Greek: Ελένη Κουναλάκη, IPA: [eˈleni kunaˈlaci]) (née Tsakopoulos; (Note: Greek: Τσακοπούλου, IPA: [tsakoˈpulu]) born March 3, 1966) is an American politician, businesswoman, and diplomat who is the treasurer-elect of California. She has served since 2019 as the 50th lieutenant governor of California. A member of the Democratic Party, she is the first woman (Note: Mona Pasquil was the first woman to serve as lieutenant governor of California, but had been appointed.) elected to the office.

Kounalakis graduated from Dartmouth College with a Bachelor of Arts degree before attending University of California, Berkeley, where she obtained a Master of Business Administration. After graduation, she worked for AKT Development Corporation, a Sacramento-based real estate company founded by her father, Angelo Tsakopoulos, eventually serving as president of the company until 2010.

Kounalakis was appointed by President Barack Obama to serve as the United States Ambassador to Hungary from 2010 to 2013. She was elected lieutenant governor of California in 2018, and reelected in 2022. As lieutenant governor, she attempted to disqualify Donald Trump from the 2024 presidential election following the Colorado Supreme Court's ruling in Anderson v. Griswold. She was subsequently doxxed and swatted, part of a pattern of criminal intimidation nationwide.

On April 24, 2023, Kounalakis announced her candidacy for governor of California in the 2026 California gubernatorial election. On August 8, 2025, she withdrew from the gubernatorial election and announced her candidacy for state treasurer.

== Early life ==
Eleni Kounalakis is the daughter of Angelo Tsakopoulos, a Sacramento developer. Kounalakis is of Greek descent, hailing from the village of Rizes in Arcadia, and grew up as a member of the Greek Orthodox Church.

She received her undergraduate degree from Dartmouth College and a Master of Business Administration from the University of California, Berkeley's Haas School of Business.

== Private career ==
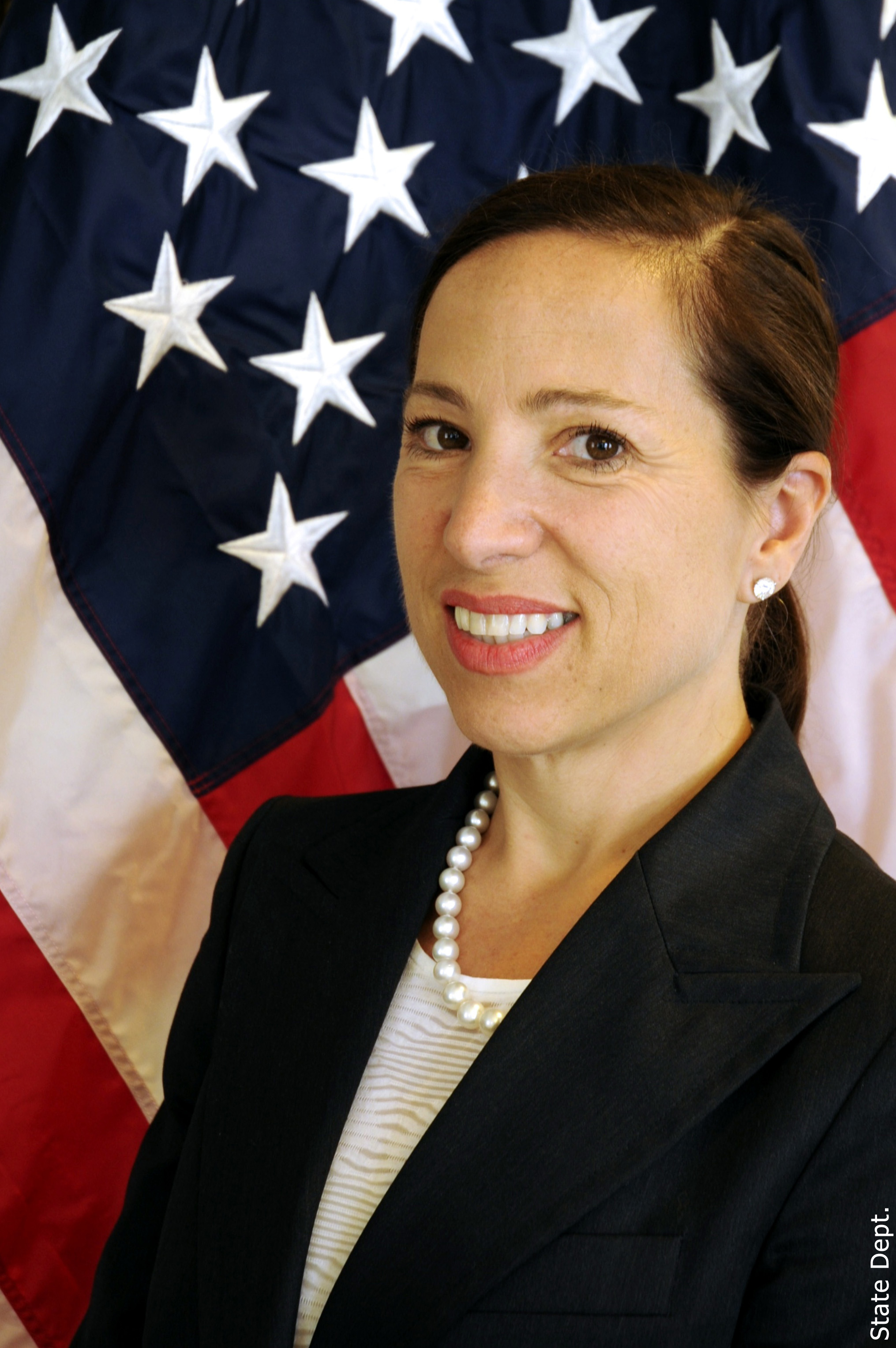
Kounalakis as U.S. ambassador

Before 2009, Kounalakis was President of AKT Development Corporation, a family-owned real estate, farming, ranching, water, minerals, building, land development and property investment company, based in Sacramento, California, founded by Angelo K Tsakopoulos, her father, in 1964.

In 2007, NEO Magazine featured Kounalakis and her husband, print and broadcast journalist Markos Kounalakis, as "Persons of the Year".

Kounalakis and her husband founded two university chairs in Hellenic studies, the Markos and Eleni Tsakopoulos Kounalakis chair at Georgetown University, held by the scholar of late Classical and early Hellenistic Greek literature, Alexander Sens, and the Tsakopoulos Kounalakis chair in honor of Constantine Mitsotakis at Stanford University, held by Josiah Ober. Both chairs focus on the understanding of the origins of Athenian democracy. They also established the Tsakopoulos Kounalakis lecture series at the Woodrow Wilson International Center for Scholars to focus on democracy and international relations.

Kounalakis served for nearly ten years as a Trustee of the World Council of Religions for Peace. In recognition for her work with the WCRP, she was awarded the medal of St. Paul, the Greek Orthodox Church of America's highest honor. San Francisco Mayor Gavin Newsom appointed her to serve as a Trustee of the War Memorial and Performing Arts Center. San Francisco Mayor Ed Lee appointed her to serve on the Port Commission Board. She is a friend and former mentee of Kamala Harris.

== Political career ==
Since 1996, Kounalakis has served seven times as a delegate to the Democratic National Convention and as an at-large member of the California State Democratic Central Committee. She also served as a member of the First 5 California Commission, and the California Blue Ribbon Commission on Autism. She served as a Trustee of Robert Redford's Sundance Preserve and on the Conservation Fund's National Forum on Children and Nature. She is also a senior advisor at Albright Stonebridge Group.

=== Ambassadorship ===
In 2009, Kounalakis accepted President Barack Obama's nomination as the United States Ambassador to Hungary.

=== Lieutenant Governor ===
On April 24, 2017, Kounalakis announced her bid for the office of Lieutenant Governor of California in the 2018 election. After her candidacy announcement, she visited all 58 counties in California during her campaign. Her grassroots campaign earned the recognition of Time magazine for engaging hundreds of volunteers to text over 1 million voters before Election Day. She came in first place on June 5, 2018, in the top-two statewide primary; Democratic State Senator Ed Hernandez placed second. On November 6, Kounalakis was elected by a 56.6% to 43.3% margin against her opponent, becoming the first female elected Lieutenant Governor of California in history; Mona Pasquil was appointed in an acting capacity in 2009 following the resignation of John Garamendi but was not elected to the post. Kounalakis and Governor-elect Gavin Newsom took office on January 7, 2019.

Kounalakis was re-elected lieutenant governor in 2022.

Kounalakis serves on the Regents of the University of California (the lieutenant governor of California holds one seat). In September 2023, she voted to delay approval of an eight-story, 545-bed dorm for UCLA students in Los Angeles's affluent Westwood neighborhood due to concerns of undersized dorms. The board approved the project in November 2023.

Following her efforts to disqualify Donald Trump from the 2024 presidential election, she was doxxed and swatted, part of a series of similar events nationwide.

=== 2026 election ===
She announced her candidacy for governor in the 2026 election on April 24, 2023. On August 8, 2025, she announced that she would be dropping out of the Governor's race, in favor of running for State Treasurer. She ran against State Senator Anna Caballero and State Board of Equalization Board Member Tony Vazquez and won, advancing to the general election. She faces Republican retired businesswoman Jennifer Hawks in the general election.

== Personal life ==
Eleni Tsakopoulos married Markos Kounalakis in 2000. They have two sons.

In 2011, she received an Honorary Doctor of Law from the American College of Greece. She is Greek Orthodox and received the St. Paul Medal, "the Greek Orthodox Church of America's highest honor."

== Electoral history ==
=== 2018 ===
2018 California lieutenant gubernatorial election
Primary election
Party	Candidate	Votes	%
Democratic	Eleni Kounalakis	1,587,940	24.2%
Democratic	Ed Hernandez	1,347,442	20.6%
Republican	Cole Harris	1,144,003	17.5%
Democratic	Jeff Bleich	648,045	9.9%
Republican	David Fennell	515,956	7.9%
Republican	Lydia Ortega	419,512	6.4%
Republican	David R. Hernandez	404,982	6.2%
No party preference	Gayle McLaughlin	263,364	4.0%
Libertarian	Tim Ferreira	99,949	1.5%
Democratic	Cameron Gharabiklou	78,267	1.2%
No party preference	Danny Thomas	44,121	0.7%
No party preference	Marjan S. Fariba (write-in)	18	0.0%
Total votes		6,553,599	100.0%
General election
Democratic	Eleni Kounalakis	5,914,068	56.55%
Democratic	Ed Hernandez	4,543,863	43.45%
Total votes		10,457,931	100.00%
Democratic hold			

=== 2022 ===
2022 California lieutenant gubernatorial election
Primary election
Party	Candidate	Votes	%
Democratic	Eleni Kounalakis (incumbent)	3,617,121	52.65%
Republican	Angela Underwood Jacobs	1,365,468	19.88%
Republican	David Fennell	922,493	13.43%
Republican	Clint W. Saunders	306,216	4.46%
Democratic	Jeffrey Highbear Morgan	229,121	3.33%
Peace and Freedom	Mohammad Arif	183,150	2.67%
Democratic	William Cavett Saacke	171,800	2.50%
No party preference	David Hillberg	74,289	1.08%
No party preference	James Orlando Ogle (write-in)	25	0.0%
Total votes		6,869,683	100.0%
General election
Democratic	Eleni Kounalakis (incumbent)	6,418,114	59.70%
Republican	Angela Underwood Jacobs	4,332,598	40.30%
Total votes		10,750,712	100.0%
Democratic hold			

== See also ==
- List of female lieutenant governors in the United States

== Notes ==
Diplomatic posts
Preceded by April Foley	United States Ambassador to Hungary; 2010–2013	Succeeded by Colleen Bell
Party political offices
Preceded by Gavin Newsom	Democratic nominee for Lieutenant Governor of California; 2018, 2022	Succeeded by Fiona Ma
Preceded by Fiona Ma	Democratic nominee for Treasurer of California; 2026	Most recent
Political offices
Preceded by Gavin Newsom	Lieutenant Governor of California; 2019–present	Incumbent
