= ADSS =

ADSS may refer to:

- Actes et documents du Saint Siège relatifs à la Seconde Guerre Mondiale Papal documents during the Second World War
- ADSS (company), a private financial services firm headquartered in Abu Dhabi
- Alberni District Secondary School, a high school in British Columbia Canada
- All-dielectric self-supporting cable, a type of fibre optic cable used by electrical power transmission companies
- Adenylosuccinate synthase, an enzyme

== See also ==
- ADS (disambiguation), for the singular of ADSs
