= Pakistan women's national shooting team =

National sports team

The Pakistan women's national shooting team represents Pakistan in international shooting competitions. It is administered by the National Rifle Association of Pakistan (NRAP). Members of the team compete in both rifle and pistol events at competitions including the continental and regional games (Asian and South Asian Games). In 2016, Minhal Sohail became the first woman sports shooter from Pakistan to compete at the Summer Olympic Games when she participated on a quota place at the Rio Games.

== Members ==
Current Members
Name	Domestic team	Competitions	Events	Position/Medal
Anna Ibtisam	Pakistan Army	South Asian Games: 2019 1st Asian online shooting championship 2021	10m air pistol: individual and team10m air pistol: individual	Silver (team), bronze (individual)9th
Kishmala Talat	Pakistan Army	7th ASC Youth Training camp South Asian Games: 2019 1st Asian online shooting championship 2021	10m air pistol 10m air pistol: individual and team 10m air pistol: individual	Silver (team)26th
Mehwish Farhan		South Asian Games: 2019	10m air pistol: team	Silver (team)
Minhal Sohail	Pakistan Navy	Asian Games: 2014 Commonwealth Games: 2018 Olympics: 2016	10m air rifle 10m air rifle 10m air rifle	22 12; 28
Nadira Raees		Asian Games: 2014 South Asian Games: 2016, 2019	10m air rifle 50m rifle prone (team) (2016), 50m rifle 3 position (team) (2016) 10m air rifle mixed team (2019)	53 Silver (prone), bronze (3 positions) bronze (mixed team)

Former Members
Name	Domestic team	Competitions	Events	Medals
Azra Nazir		South Asian Games: 2010	10m air pistol (team)	Silver
Farhat Nasreen		South Asian Games: 2016	25m Sports Pistol (team)	Bronze
Lubina Amin		South Asian Games: 2016	25m Sports Pistol (team)	Bronze
Mehwish Maqsood		South Asian Games: 2010	10m air pistol (team)	Silver
Nadia Rashid		South Asian Games: 2016	50m rifle prone (team), 50m rifle 3 Position (team)	Silver (prone), Bronze (3 positions)
Naheeda Naqvi		South Asian Games: 2010	10m air rifle (team)	Bronze
Nazish Khan		South Asian Games: 2010 2016	2010: 10m air rifle (team) 2016: 50m rifle prone (team), 50 M Rifle 3 Position (team)	2010: Bronze 2016: Silver (prone), Bronze (3 positions)
Nosheen Maqsood Ali		South Asian Games: 2010	10m air rifle (team)	Bronze
Tazeem Akhtar		South Asian Games: 2010, 2016	2010: 10m air pistol (team) 2016: 25m Sports Pistol (team)	2010: Silver 2016: Bronze

== Results ==
=== South Asian Games ===
Year	10m Air pistol (individual)	10m Air pistol (team)	25m Sports pistol (team)	10m Air rifle (team)	10m Air rifle (mixed team)	50m Rifle prone (team)	50m Rifle 3 Position (team)
(Bangladesh) Dhaka 2010	--	Silver		Bronze	--		
(India) Guwahati 2016			Bronze		--	Silver	Bronze
(Nepal) Kathmandu 2019	Bronze	Silver			Bronze		
