= Angelo K. Tsakopoulos =

American businessman

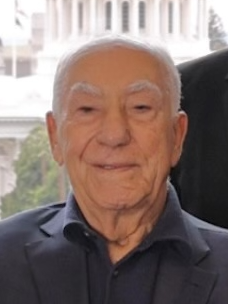
- Tsakopoulos in 2022
- Born: August 4, 1936 (age 90); Rizes, Arcadia, Greece
- Occupations: Real estate developer, businessman
- Years active: 1964–present
- Known for: Founder of AKT Development
- Spouses: Elaine Demson; Sofia Leones
- Children: 6, including Eleni Kounalakis
- Relatives: Markos Kounalakis (son-in-law) George Demos (son-in-law)

Angelo K. Tsakopoulos (born August 4, 1936) is a Greek-American businessman, real estate developer and philanthropist in Sacramento, California. He is the founder and owner of AKT Development, presently serving as co-chairman and CEO. Tsakopoulos attended California State University, Sacramento.

In 2002, he purchased a 70,000 volume collection on Hellenistic civilization and donated it to the library of California State University, Sacramento where it is available for use by the community.

From 2009 to 2012, Tsakopoulos was a minority owner of the Sacramento Mountain Lions franchise of the short lived United Football League.

== Early life and career ==
Tsakopoulos was born in Rizes, a small village in Arcadia, Greece. He arrived in the United States in 1951, lived for a while in Chicago, Illinois, and eventually settled in Sacramento, California. His older brother, George, came to the United States in 1955 after being wounded in the Greek Civil War. He later also became a major investor with his brother in Sacramento real estate. Tsakopoulos founded AKT Development Inc. in 1964 when the company made its first real estate sale. The business controls 47,000 acres around Sacramento. George died at age 81 in Sacramento, California.

Tsakopoulos' daughter, Eleni Kounalakis, was president of AKT Development until 2010. She is married to journalist and scholar Markos Kounalakis. Eleni served as United States Ambassador to Hungary from 2010 to 2013 and is the Lieutenant Governor of California. Angelo's daughter, Chrysa Tsakopoulos, is married to George Demos, a former United States Securities and Exchange Commission prosecutor and Congressional candidate. Angelo's son, Kyriakos Tsakopoulos, is the current co-chairman and president of AKT Development and a former alumni trustee of Columbia University.

In 2006, Angelo and Eleni provided uncoordinated financial support via a nominally independent organization for then-California State Treasurer Phil Angelides in his unsuccessful campaign for Governor of California.

In 2015, Angelo and his wife Sofia donated nearly 33 acres of vacant land valued at more than $10 million to San Francisco-based Dignity Health to increase access to health care services in the greater Sacramento area.

== Clean Water Act violation ==
Tsakopoulos was fined by the United States Environmental Protection Agency for a violation of the Clean Water Act. Tsakopoulos sued the government and was able to bring his case to the U.S. Supreme Court, though the Court ruled against him.

"The case grew out of Tsakopoulos' preparations to subdivide part of the 8,350 acres (3,380 hectares) Borden Ranch into apple orchards and vineyards. He used a method of soil preparation called deep plowing or deep ripping to loosen the clay subsurface of nearly 1,000 acres (400 hectares) so that the roots of deep-growing trees and vines could penetrate. During the course of that work, about 2 acres (0.81 hectares) of wetlands also were plowed, although to lesser depths."..."But Tsakopoulos argued that normal farming practices, including deep plowing, were excluded specifically from the Clean Water Act."

"The government said that was true only if the plowing did not change the character of the farmland."

Justice Anthony Kennedy recused himself from the case because of his acquaintance with Tsakopoulos, leaving only eight justices to decide the matter. The voted ended in a 4–4 tie. As such, the ruling against Tsakopoulos by the 9th Circuit Court of Appeals was automatically affirmed.

== See also ==
- John Sitilides, (The Western Policy Center)
