= Portugal properties scandal =

Political scandals in Pakistan

In early August 2025, Pakistan's Defence Minister Khawaja Asif made claims that over half of the country's senior bureaucrats had purchased properties in Portugal and were arranging to obtain European (Portuguese) citizenship using illicit wealth. He alleged that these officials accumulated vast sums, "billions of rupees", through corrupt practices during their tenure, enabling them to retire abroad in comfort and evade accountability.

Among the accusations, one civil servant close to former Punjab Chief Minister Usman Buzdar was said to have received an extravagant Rs 4 billion in "salami" (a traditional gift) during his daughter's wedding. Asif contrasted this with politicians, who he said receive only "leftovers" and cannot hide abroad due to electoral pressures.

== Background ==
The Golden Visa program in Portugal, previously allowing residency via real estate investment, facilitated many such acquisitions—though the real estate route was discontinued in 2023. The scheme issued nearly 5,000 visas in 2024, its popularity surged due to Spain discontinuing its own program in April 2025.

== Defence minister's statements ==
Asif publicly asserted that a Lahore-based builder, referred to by the surname "Virk," is orchestrating these property acquisitions and European shelter arrangements for bureaucrats.

On 11 August 2025, the minister promised to disclose the names of implicated officials and claimed that photographic records of the buyers exist.

== Investigations ==
On 13 August 2025, the Public Accounts Committee (PAC), chaired by Junaid Akbar, formally took notice of Asif's allegations.

The PAC summoned various agencies—including the Ministry of Interior, State Bank of Pakistan, Federal Board of Revenue (FBR), and the Establishment Division—to provide a detailed briefing and submit records detailing which bureaucrats have acquired property in Portugal.

The committee demanded full transparency and accountability, citing potential misuse of public funds.

In mid-2025, concerns over foreign asset ownership among civil servants led to amendments in the Civil Servants Act. Now, officers in grades 17 to 22 must declare both domestic and foreign assets, including those held by immediate family members. The information is to be published via the FBR.

== Reactions ==
=== Public ===
The scandal ignited widespread public concern, with critics demanding evidence, legal action, and systemic reforms to check bureaucratic corruption. No formal investigations had been launched at the time of the reports, intensifying calls for accountability.

== See also ==
- Dubai Unlocked
