= Dubai Uncovered =

2022 leak detailing property ownership in Dubai

Dubai Uncovered is the name of a leak detailing property ownership in Dubai. The data, originally from 2020, was revealed in 2022.

It revealed 274,000 owners of 800,000 properties located in Dubai. Of these, 191,000 were foreigners. The data was originally obtained by Center for Advanced Defense Studies (C4ADS), before being shared with the Norwegian financial newspaper E24, who then led the investigation. 25 international media outlets co-operated to investigate the leak.

Dubai has been described as "one of the most opaque financial hubs in the world", and one of the most popular destinations for illicit money. According to Brussels Times, the leak revealed "a huge black hole in international anti-money laundering efforts centered [sic] around the Dubai real estate market". The leak revealed that over 100 members of the Russian elite held properties in the city, including heavily-sanctioned individuals like Ruslan Baisarov and Ramzan Kadyrov. Additionally, internationally wanted criminals have been implicated, like Daniel Kinahan.

The investigation in Norway revealed how 85% of the locally listed owners of Dubai properties had not reported it to their national tax authorities as required by law.

== See also ==
- Bahamas Leaks
- Cyprus Papers
- Dubai Papers
- Dubai Unlocked
- Panama Papers
- Pandora Papers
- Paradise Papers
