= Philippe Ghanem =

Swiss businessman (born 1980)

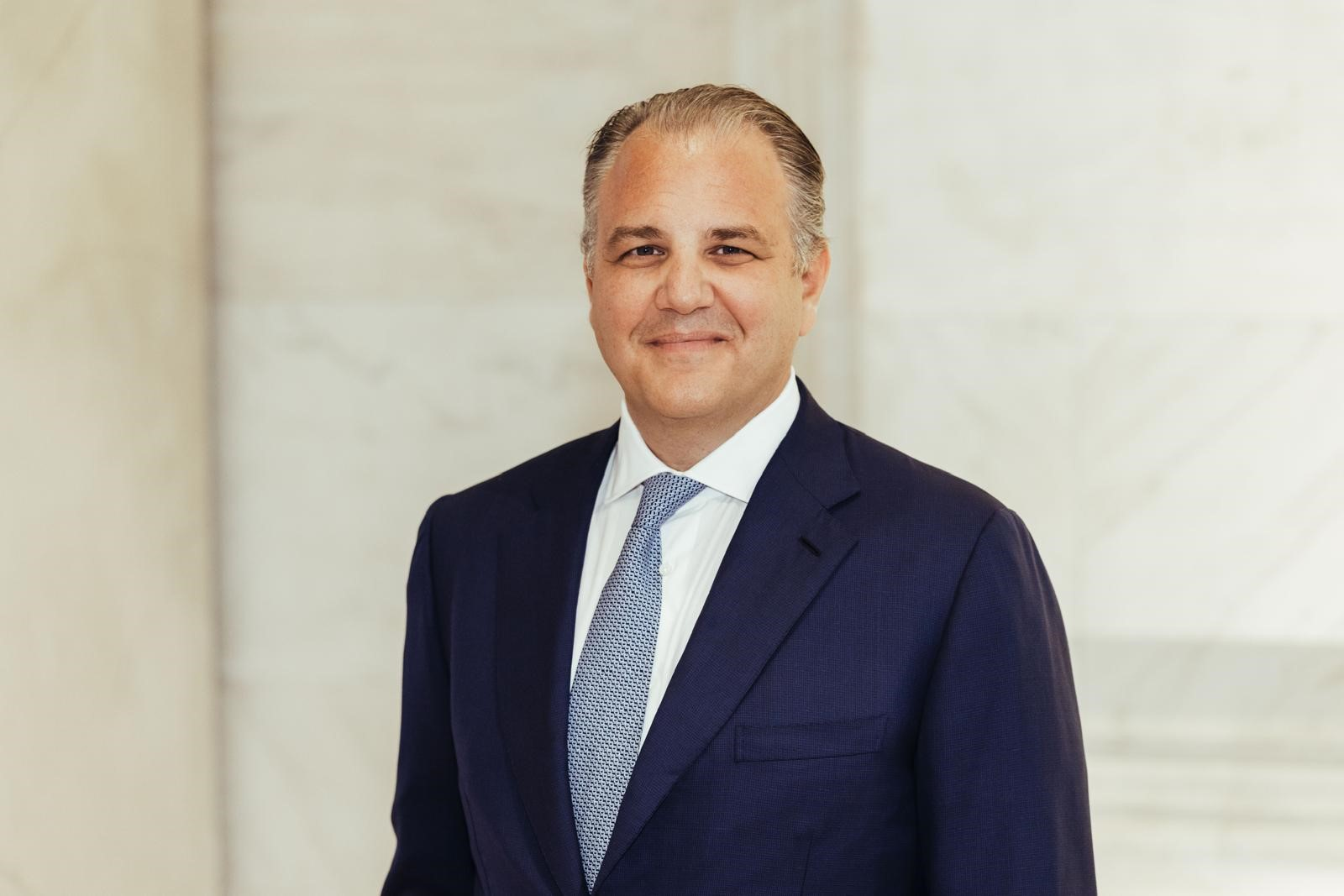
- Born: October 4, 1980 (age 45); Switzerland
- Education: International University in Geneva, 2002
- Occupation: Business executive
- Known for: Executive Chairman at SquaredFinancial; CEO of ADS Securities; Vice chairman of ADS Holding; Chairman of ADS Securities London Limited
- Relatives: Sabine Getty (sister)

Philippe Ghanem (born 4 October 1980) is a Swiss businessman and financial services executive. He is the founder of SquaredFinancial and has held senior positions at ADS Securities (later ADSS).

== Career ==
In 2005, Ghanem and Georges Cohen co-founded the Dublin-based Squared Financial Services Limited.

In February 2011, he became managing director of ADS Securities, which rebranded to ADSS in 2018. He later became CEO of ADSS and vice-chairman of its parent company. His departure from ADSS was announced in June 2019.

In 2020, Ghanem returned to SquaredFinancial as Executive Chairman. The company later reported growth in trading volumes and profitability in 2021.

== Public speaking and media ==
Ghanem has spoken at international conferences, including the Forbes Global CEO Conference in 2011 and the Abu Dhabi Investment Forum in 2012. He has appeared as a guest commentator on CNBC and was profiled by The Banker Middle East.

== Areas of focus ==
Ghanem has worked on low-latency trading platforms and promoted the use of artificial intelligence and blockchain in financial markets.

== Personal life ==
Ghanem received a Bachelor of Science in business administration from the International University in Geneva in 2002. He was born in Switzerland and lives in Geneva. In 2021, the Monaco Sport Academy announced a collaboration with the Yacht Club de Monaco involving Ghanem. He speaks English, French and Arabic.

== See also ==
- ADS Securities
- Foreign exchange market
