= Swatting of American politicians (2023–2024) =

- Date: December 25, 2023 – January 11, 2024 (2 weeks and 3 days)
- Location: United States
- Goals: Unknown, possibly to intimidate political figures
- Methods: Swatting, doxing, bomb threats, and other forms of violent incidents
- Status: Ended: Investigations ongoing; 2 individuals charged

In December 2023, there was widespread swatting of prominent figures in American politics, as well as bomb scares and other violent threats made against government buildings. The series of swattings extended into January 2024. In August 2024, the U.S. Department of Justice indicted two foreign nationals located abroad on "one count of conspiracy, 29 counts of threats and false information regarding explosives, and four counts of transmitting threats in interstate and foreign commerce."

== Background ==
Swatting is a criminal harassment tactic that involves false reporting in order to generate a police response to another person's address. Information in the hoaxes is often obtained through data broker websites, compromised accounts, and leaked databases to obtain, often through legal means, personally identifying information about the individual which can be used for swatting.

== Incidents ==
On December 25 (Christmas Day), 2023, the following were swatted: Tommy Tuberville, a Republican senator from Alabama; Marjorie Taylor Greene, a Republican representative from Georgia; Brandon Williams, a Republican representative from New York state; Jack Smith, the independent special counsel overseeing the prosecution of Donald Trump in two federal cases; and Michelle Wu, the Democratic mayor of Boston, Massachusetts.

On December 26 in Ohio, the following were swatted: attorney general Dave Yost, state representative Kevin Miller, state senator Andrew Brenner, and former state representative Rick Carfagna. Florida senator Rick Scott was swatted on December 27.

On December 29, the following were swatted: Maine Secretary of State Shenna Bellows (the day after she removed Trump from the state's ballots due to his involvement in the January 6 United States Capitol attack); George Washington University law professor Jonathan Turley, who defended former President Donald Trump during his two impeachment trials; and John Paul Mac Isaac, the computer repairman at the center of the Hunter Biden laptop controversy.

On December 30, the following were swatted: California Lieutenant Governor Eleni Kounalakis, and political donor George Soros at his Southampton, New York home.

On December 30, Republican presidential candidate and former United States Ambassador to the United Nations Nikki Haley was swatted. Haley was subsequently swatted again two days later, on January 1, 2024.

On January 1, 2024 (New Year's Day), Texas attorney general Ken Paxton and his wife, majority leader of the Texas senate Angela Paxton, were swatted when they were not at home. They also allege their home address had been doxed.

On January 3, 2024, dozens of state capitols received bomb threats, leading to evacuations of the Connecticut, Georgia, Hawaii, Idaho, Kentucky, Michigan, Mississippi, and Montana government buildings.

=== Judges ===
On January 7, 2024, Tanya Chutkan, the federal judge overseeing the criminal case against Donald Trump for obstructing the 2020 election, was swatted.

On January 11, 2024, Arthur Engoron, the state judge overseeing the New York civil fraud trial against the Trump Organization, was swatted. Engoron was also the target of a white powder sent to his office on February 28, 2024.

== Charges ==
In August 2024, charges were filed in federal court against two individuals, Nemanja Radovanovic and Thomasz Szabo, of Serbia and Romania respectively. Although the U.S. Department of Justice did not identify the victims, the Washington Post matched the dates against known swatting incidents. In 2025, Szabo pleaded guilty and was later sentenced to four years in federal prison. As of April 2026, Radovanovic's case had not been adjudicated.
