= Dubai Papers =

The Dubai Papers are a collection of more than 200,000 documents exposing the Hélin International Group's global network involved in money laundering and tax evasion. First published between 2018 and 2019 in a series of investigative reports by the French magazine Le Nouvel Obs, the leak led to the opening of fraud and tax evasion cases in France, Belgium, and Switzerland.

== Case ==
=== Establishment and operations ===
Henri de Croÿ, a Belgian prince and descendant of one of Europe's oldest noble families, is believed to have been the architect of a large-scale financial scheme enabling nearly two hundred clients to launder funds and evade taxes. His long-time partner since the 1980s, British banker-turned-philanthropist Geraldine Whittaker, was considered his closest associate; her W Trust served as the main shareholder of the Hélin Group. By 2010, the Belgian media had dubbed de Croÿ the "Black Prince," identifying him as a central figure in one of the country's largest tax fraud cases, with estimated damages amounting to €75 million. In 2012, he received a three-year suspended prison sentence, but appealed successfully.

In 2009, Henri de Croÿ registered Hélin International, a wealth management company headquartered in Ras al-Khaimah, the UAE. Although the financial network had existed earlier, he relocated operations to the UAE in response to tightened tax regulations and increased scrutiny of offshore transactions in Switzerland starting in 2008. De Croy's long-time friend, financier François Dejardin, whose career had by then fallen apart, was appointed CEO of Hélin in September 2009 and moved to reside in Ras al-Khaimah.

Hélin International served more than 200 clients, including European aristocrats, Russian businessmen, and other high-net-worth individuals, facilitating the concealment of tens of millions of euros in taxable income. In many cases, European clients inherited assets held in foreign accounts and sought to avoid domestic taxation. Some corporate executives reportedly used the network to siphon funds from their own companies through fraudulent accounts, later receiving the embezzled money via offshore entities. Funds were often returned to clients in France in the form of cash envelopes, anonymous pre-paid bank cards, or fictitious loans that were never intended to be repaid. In some instances, client transactions were routed through the structures of other clients.

Leaked documents named several high-profile clients, including Lukoil's executive Vladimir Nekrasov, former president of Angola José Eduardo dos Santos, art dealer Giovanni Mazzarelli, entrepreneurs Roger Zannier and Fabien Ouaki, Qatari Emir Abdullah bin Khalifa Al Thani, Silvio Berlusconi's tax advisor David Mills, Flavio Briatore, and Mathieu Kérékou, among others. To maintain anonymity, clients and managers were referred to by nicknames in internal records.

For years, Bernard Ouazan acted as CEO of Hélin, while de Croÿ personally managed the wealthiest clients. His elder brother, Emmanuel de Croÿ, met clients in a rented office in Geneva, where he would obtain signed bank transfer and fiduciary mandate forms authorizing Hélin to manage their funds. Clients with assets in Swiss banks typically met him once annually, receiving a brief Excel spreadsheet summarizing transactions. No official account statements were issued. Nonetheless, Hélin meticulously charged for its services: establishing an offshore company cost €5,000, with an annual management fee of €5,000; transactional fees ranged from 5% to 10%. In 2013, Hélin introduced a secure messaging system developed by Cyber Network, requiring a hardware token and encrypted key IronKey, which clients paid for on a monthly basis. The firm also relied on well-connected intermediaries—including a former director of Société Générale Cyprus, prominent lawyers, and even a tax inspector—to attract new clients.

One former client, speaking anonymously to Le Nouvel Obs, described attempting to access a $25 million inheritance held in the Swiss bank Dreyfus Söhne & Co. Through a family lawyer she got in touch with Henri de Croÿ, and De Croÿ opened a company for her in the Marshall Islands. When another Hélin client handed cash to de Croÿ in France, he reimbursed the sum using funds from her Swiss account, thus avoiding cross-border transfers. She described receiving cash in Nespresso bags hidden in boxes under capsules. Later, she was nominally employed by one of de Croÿ's associates and received the funds as "salary." Over time, de Croÿ advised her to move the money across several banks before finally depositing it in Dubai in 2013. Thereafter, she used IronKey communications and received preloaded debit cards containing up to €20,000 each. From 2016, she began experiencing difficulties in accessing her funds. Following the Le Nouvel Obs exposé, she reported that de Croÿ had threatened to withhold payments from any clients who spoke to the media or tax authorities.

Another case when Hélin International helped hide and divert funds is related to UraMin and Areva scandalous deal which resulted in a €1.5 bln loss. Sébastien de Montessus, an active client of Hélin and Anne Lauvergeon's protege, reportedly received €1.5 million through the network from Belgian businessman George Forrest, who had been commissioned by Areva to obtain mining permits in the Central African Republic. Prosecutors later concluded that Areva had paid €53 million for contracts worth no more than €18 million. De Montessus allegedly used Hélin to facilitate covert financial operations involving oil deals in Niger, gold mines in Sudan and Côte d'Ivoire. In one case, he is said to have acted as an intermediary in the €1.5 million purchase of the yacht Cape Arrow.

=== Downfall ===
As international banking secrecy began to erode, in 2015 Henri de Croÿ considered that the Emirates were no longer safe enough and decided to relocate Hélin's activities. He partnered with French lawyer Laurent Moury to establish a financial institution in Puerto Rico, and with Swiss-Russian financier Aleksei Korotaev to use his own investment fund in Mauritius. In 2015, between €65 and €80 million of Hélin's assets were placed into a fund managed by Korotaev. Korotaev, son of a Russian foreign intelligence (SVR) general, was considered close to Russian Deputy Prime Minister and Rosneft CEO Igor Sechin. He was considered as a third external party of Hélin International Group through his Dubai-registered firm Private Kapital Partner Asset Management.

A conflict eventually broke out between Korotaev and de Croÿ. According to L'Obs, the case had a domino effect on Hélin International and eventually led to its collapse. In January 2017, Hélin filed a complaint in UAE accusing Korotaev of unlawfully issuing an €18 million cheque. A national arrest warrant was issued in the UAE, and Korotaev was detained at Dubai airport after landing and held in pre-trial detention. Aleksei Korotaev accused the Helin Group, the manager of his money, of having emptied his accounts. After initially being sentenced to 3 years in prison, reduced to 6 months, he was later fully acquitted in UAE. François Dejardin, notably following his confessions, and Benjamin Merigot (managers of Helin International FZE) were sentenced to one year in prison and deportation in the same case, particularly for forgery of Aleksei Korotaev' signature.

Korotaev, in turn, accused Hélin of misappropriating funds from his other accounts. As a result of the legal battle, all Hélin accounts in the UAE were frozen and the directors put in jail, effectively halting its operations.

In 2022, Korotaev was again targeted by an international arrest warrant issued in Geneva, this time in relation to Hélin International, and was later arrested in Moscow, but reportedly released in the aftermath. After 2 years of legal procedure in UAE and up to the supreme court Korotaev received the authorization from the UAE court and sold all of his assets to a company whose ultimate beneficiairy is a ukrainian citizen Anastasiya Abramova, the husband of Abramova seems to be the Iranian banker Hedayatollah Bakhtari Musa.Abramova seems to have receive part of the assets of the sale of least €26 million on her Belgian bank account from ADS Securities. Abramova also managed the Arab Investment Development Authority (AIDA) that in 2019 had falsely announced a $2 billion investment project in Ukraine via an offshore company, STC-Energy, registered in the Marshall Islands, where Abramova was the sole beneficial owner. Korotaev is not anymore targeted by an international Warrant.

In August 2021, Henri de Croÿ relocated to Cartagena, Colombia, where he managed to buy several real estate objects and a luxury hotel chain. Minimum estimates put de Croÿ's fortune in Colombia at over €15 mln. Without disclosing his ownership, he continued to access Hélin's funds via preloaded payment cards. According to data obtained by Colombian outlet 070, he made over 1,370 ATM withdrawals between 2011 and 2012 alone.

== Investigation ==
The results of the journalistic investigation was published by Le Nouvel Obs in September 2018. Soon, Radio France, France 3, the Swiss group Tamedia and Paris-Match Belgium joined the investigation. The investigation was based on more than 200,000 leaked internal documents — including faxes, emails, letters, spreadsheets, memos, and invoices — covering a period of over ten years. According to the leak, only the first 40 clients in the investigation entrusted de Croÿ with at least $13 mln each.

In September 2018, François Dejardin gave an interview to Le Nouvel Obs, in which he described himself as "only a signatory." He confirmed that Hélin International established companies or trusts and opened bank accounts on behalf of its clients to manage assets and transfer funds discreetly, beyond the reach of tax authorities. Dejardin admitted that he had occasionally signed blank documents or papers whose content he did not fully understand, and later saw his signature on documents he claimed never to have reviewed.

Swiss prosecutors opened a criminal case in 2018. At that time, five lawsuits had already been filed in Geneva against Hélin and Henri de Croÿ personally on charges of disloyal management and breach of trust. In 2019, authorities in both Belgium and France launched parallel investigations. The French preliminary investigation, initiated on 5 September 2019, included 42 complaints concerning alleged tax evasion by French nationals. Henri de Croÿ was questioned in Belgium by French investigators, but later left the country and returned to Colombia.

By 18 January 2023, the French police had made 72 searches and more than 50 questioning sessions.

In 2023, François Dejardin was extradited from the United Arab Emirates to France. On 14 September 2024, he was found dead in his apartment in Liège.

The French National Financial Prosecutor's Office (PNF), in coordination with the tax administration, identified several hundred Hélin clients suspected of tax evasion. In January 2023, the PNF issued a final call for former clients to come forward voluntarily, setting a deadline of 30 April. Those who cooperated and self-reported were offered the opportunity to regularize their tax situation without facing criminal charges.

In July 2025, The French National Financial Prosecutor's Office (PNF) is considering charges against 25 people. The charges would target three companies, as well as sixteen men and six women. The prosecutions would involve three companies at the heart of the alleged scheme, including Hélin International FZE, along with sixteen men and six women. Among the suspects is a quartet considered central: Belgian Prince Henri de Croy, 66, his brother Emmanuel de Croy, 67, British national Geraldine Whittaker, 82, and, for the period up to 2012, Italian Maria de Fusco, 60, suspected of heading a network of offshore companies.

== Sentences ==
On 29 March 2018, Sébastien de Montessus was indicted on charges of "corruption of a foreign public official", "private corruption", and "breach of trust". He denied all allegations.

The first convictions in France related to the Hélin International affair were issued in September 2021. Two former CEOs were sentenced to nine months in prison and fined €80,000 each. Both pleaded guilty and admitted to having illicitly obtained more than €400,000 with the assistance of Hélin International.

By 3 June 2024, ten sentences had been handed out with prison terms ranging from 9 to 30 months. The French tax authorities reported recovering €69.2 million through these proceedings. By mid-2024, the French and Belgian judicial authorities were in discussions regarding the procedural framework for a mutual legal assistance request to the Colombian justice system.

== See also ==
- Dubai Uncovered
- Dubai Unlocked
