= Alam Jan Mehsud =

Pakistani general and sports administrator

Alam Jan Mahsud

President of the National Rifle Association of Pakistan
- Incumbent
- Assumed office 1986

Commander of IV Corps

Inspector General, Frontier Corps Balochistan

Military service
- Branch/service: Pakistan Army
- Rank: Lieutenant general

Alam Jan Mahsud was a Pakistani general and sports administrator from South Waziristan. He served as inspector general of Frontier Corps Balochistan in the late 1970s and was serving as commander of IV Corps in Lahore in 1990. He also became the first president of the National Rifle Association of Pakistan when it was revived in 1986.

== Early life ==
Mahsud belonged to South Waziristan.

== Military career ==
In 1979, Mahsud was serving the inspector general of the Balochistan Frontier Corps. In June 1990, Prime Minister Benazir Bhutto sought an extension of his tenure as Corps Commander Lahore but the Army Selection Board instead named Ashraf Janjua to the post.

Mehsud fought in the Indo-Pakistani war of 1965.

== Personal life ==
In 2024, he was named in the Dubai leaks.
