= Dubai Unlocked =

Investigative journalism project

Dubai Leaks is a global collaborative investigative journalism project that has revealed the global elite's ownership of properties in Dubai. The project, named Dubai Unlocked, is based on data that provides a detailed overview of millions of properties in Dubai and information on their ownership or use, mostly between 2020 and 2022.

== Overview ==
The data was obtained by the Center for Advanced Defense Studies (C4ADS), a non-profit organization based in Washington, DC, that conducts research on transnational crime and conflict. It was then shared with Norwegian financial outlet E24 and the Organized Crime and Corruption Reporting Project (OCCRP), which coordinated a six-month investigative project with reporters from 74 media outlets in 58 countries.

== Pakistani property owners ==
Pakistanis are the second most foreign nationals owning properties in Dubai. The total value of properties owned by Pakistanis is estimated to be around $11 billion. More than a dozen retired military officials and their families, as well as bankers and bureaucrats, own properties in upscale areas of Dubai.

=== Notable Pakistani property owners ===
Prominent Pakistani figures listed in the Property Leaks include:

- President Asif Ali Zardari's three children
  - Bilawal Bhutto Zardari
  - Asifa Bhutto Zardari
- Hussain Nawaz Sharif
- Interior Minister Mohsin Naqvi's wife
- Sharjeel Memon and his family members
- Senator Faisal Vawda
- Four Member of the National Assembly of Pakistan
- Half a dozen Member of the Provincial Assembly from the Sindh and Balochistan
- Former COAS Pervez Musharraf
- Former prime minister Shaukat Aziz
- Alam Jan Mehsud and his wife
- Shafaat Ullah Shah and his son
- Syed Ehtesham Zamir

== Statements on the leaks ==
Reacting to Dubai Property Leaks, PPP Chairman Bilawal Bhutto Zardari's spokesperson said that all the domestic and foreign assets of Bilawal Bhutto Zardari and Asifa Bhutto Zardari have been declared before the Federal Board of Revenue (FBR) and the Election Commission of Pakistan (ECP).

Pakistan Interior Minister Mohsin Naqvi also said that the property bought in his wife's name in Dubai had been declared with the relevant authorities.

== Global impact ==
The Dubai Leaks have exposed the property ownership of not only the Pakistani elite but also other global players, such as Aliaksei Aleksin (Belarus) and Bogoljub Karić (Serbia). Data leaks have revealed how criminals, tax evaders, Russian oligarchs and other shady personalities own property in Dubai. It has also raised concerns about money laundering and the use of offshore entities to hide wealth.

== Controversies ==
The Dubai leaks have sparked controversy and debate. Some have questioned the timing of the leaks, while others have raised concerns about terrorist groups suspected of funneling money to Dubai properties.

== See also ==
- Dubai Uncovered
- Dubai Papers
