= George Demos =

American politician (born 1976)

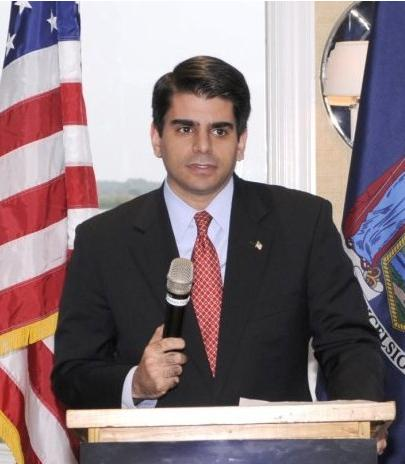
- Demos in 2010

Personal details
- Born: 1976 (age 49–50)
- Party: Republican; Conservative
- Spouse: Chrysa Tsakopoulos
- Relations: Angelo Tsakopoulos (father-in-law); Eleni Kounalakis (sister-in-law)
- Education: Columbia University (BA); Fordham University School of Law (JD)
- Profession: Attorney

George Demos is a former United States Securities and Exchange Commission prosecutor, and was a candidate for the Republican nomination for New York's 1st congressional district on New York State's Long Island. He is currently a partner at DLA Piper and an adjunct law professor at UC Davis School of Law.

== Early life ==
Demos grew up in New York City where he attended Trinity School. Demos received his B.A. from Columbia University, majoring in political science, and his J.D. from Fordham University School of Law.

== Career ==
Demos prosecuted white collar fraud as a prosecutor at the U.S. Securities and Exchange Commission (SEC) between 2002 and 2009. Demos is a partner at DLA Piper and an adjunct law professor at UC Davis School of Law, where he has taught Corporate and White Collar Crime and Presidential Powers.

=== Whistleblower disclosure investigation and dismissal ===
In 2010, it was reported by the Project On Government Oversight that the Appellate Division of the Supreme Court of the State of New York reopened an investigation into Demos for allegedly disclosing the identity of a JPMorgan Chase whistleblower while Demos served as an attorney at the SEC. Initially the 10th Judicial District Grievance Committee disposed of the allegations. However, the court committee transferred the investigation to "avoid the appearance of impropriety." In a letter dated September 23, 2011, the Third Judicial Department dismissed the matter again, stating "the Committee has determined that there is an insufficient basis for a finding of professional misconduct."

== Politics ==
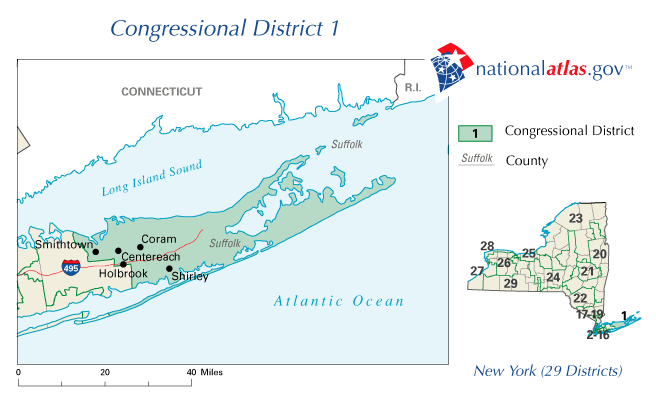
New York's 1st congressional district

=== 2010 campaign ===
Demos vied in 2010 for the Republican nomination to compete for the congressional seat of Democrat Tim Bishop on Long Island in New York State in the November 2010 election, coming in second in the primary. His three-way primary included Christopher Nixon Cox, the grandson of President Richard Nixon and Randy Altschuler, a businessman.

In the days leading up to the primary, Conservative radio host Rush Limbaugh did a "six-minute radio riff in support of George Demos in NY-1, calling the former SEC attorney the only conservative in the race." Limbaugh praised Demos and noted "the Republican establishment had turned on him [Demos]." In the September 2010 primary, Altschuler finished first with 45 percent of the vote, Demos had 30 percent, and Cox was third with 24 percent.

=== 2012 campaign ===
Demos announced another run for Congress Monday, August 8, 2011. In 2012 Demos wrote a letter to Donald Trump stating "your passion and dedication to defending (America's) interests is unequaled" and asking him to speak out against the outsourcing of American jobs to India." Demos withdrew from the race May 25, 2012.

=== 2014 campaign ===
On October 6, 2013, he announced he would seek the Republican nomination to run against Congressman Tim Bishop. On June 24, 2014 he lost the primary election to New York State Senator Lee Zeldin.

== Ground Zero Church advocacy ==
In August 2010, Demos held a press conference at Ground Zero with former New York Governor George Pataki to object to the proposed construction of the Park51 Islamic community center near Ground Zero. He said that the St. Nicholas Greek Orthodox Church, the only religious structure destroyed in the 9/11 attacks, should be rebuilt before moving forward on building an Islamic community center in the area, and called for an investigation into the center's financing.

In September 2011, Demos called on Governor Andrew Cuomo to fire Port Authority of New York and New Jersey Director Christopher Ward for "stonewalling" the church's reconstruction. On October 14, 2011, ten years after the church was destroyed in the 9/11 terror attacks, the Greek Orthodox Archdiocese signed an agreement with the Port Authority for the reconstruction of the church.

== Personal life ==
Demos is married to Chrysa Tsakopoulos, daughter of the real estate developer Angelo Tsakopoulos. His sister-in-law, Eleni Kounalakis, is the current Lieutenant Governor of California.
