= ADSS (company) =

Emirati financial service company

- Type: Private
- Industry: Financial services
- Founded: 2011; 15 years ago
- Headquarters: Abu Dhabi, United Arab Emirates
- Area served: MENA region
- Key people: Ahmed Khalifa Almehairi (CEO)
- Services: Financial investment and trading brokerage
- Number of employees: 180 (2014)
- Website: www.adss.com

ADSS (ADS Securities until 2018) is an Abu Dhabi-based financial services company that provides online trading, investment, wealth management, and asset management services to institutional, private, and retail clients. Established in 2011, ADSS expanded its brokerage activities and operated through subsidiaries and representative offices in financial centres including Hong Kong, Singapore, and London.

The company has drawn attention for its role in bond financing linked to Etihad Airways Partners and for being mentioned as an intermediary in reporting related to the Dubai Papers investigation.

== History ==
ADS Securities was founded in March 2011 with private capital. Philippe Ghanem was appointed as CEO, and Mahmood Ebraheem Al Mahmood was the executive chairman.

In April 2011, shortly after its establishment, ADS Securities was named "Fastest Newcomer" at the Middle East Forex Awards. By May 2011, the firm reported daily trading volumes of approximately $2 billion and announced that prime brokers including Goldman Sachs and BNP Paribas had joined its platform. In August 2011, the company expanded by registering ADS Securities Hong Kong Limited.

By 2014, ADS Securities had over 10,000 clients. On 4 May 2016, it introduced OREX mobile, an Arabic-language trading application. By 2017, the firm reported a global presence with offices in London, Singapore, and Hong Kong, and launched Bitcoin CFDs for clients in the MENA region.

In 2017, the group launched ADS Investment Solutions, focusing on wealth and asset management.

In early 2018, ADS Securities incorporated Autochartist into its trading platform and expanded its cryptocurrency offering to include Bitcoin Cash, Litecoin, and Ripple. In June 2018, the company rebranded itself from ADS Securities to ADSS.

In June 2019, ADS Investment Solutions launched a Saudi Arabian smart beta fund. A month later, Philippe Ghanem resigned as CEO, with Mahmood Ebraheem Al Mahmood temporarily stepping into the CEO role. The company experienced further senior executive turnover in subsequent years.

In January 2024, ADSS introduced a cloud-based trading platform developed in collaboration with Adaptive Financial Consulting.

On 6 June 2024, ADSS became an official trading member of the Abu Dhabi Securities Exchange (ADX).

In December 2024, Ahmed Khalifa Almehairi was appointed as CEO of ADSS, succeeding Mahmood Ebraheem Al Mahmood.

In April 2026, ADSS became a trading and clearing member of the Dubai Financial Market (DFM), allowing clients to trade DFM-listed securities.

=== ADSS UK ===
The company that later became ADSS UK was authorised by the Financial Conduct Authority (FCA) in 2012 under its previous ownership. In 2014, ADS Holding acquired the FCA-regulated Pioneer Trader Limited and rebranded it as ADS Securities London Limited. In 2016, the subsidiary reported an operating loss of £3.1 million, prompting a restructuring that included team downsizing, expense reductions, and a shift toward retail business. Despite these efforts, the UK division experienced declining revenues. In 2019, revenue fell by 44%, partially offset by a £3.26 million capital injection from the parent company. In 2020, revenues fell from £4.99 million to £3.09 million. In 2021, overall revenue rose by 50% to more than £4.5 million, while revenue excluding transfer-pricing income fell by 34% and net profit increased by more than 90% to £376,583. Between 2021 and 2023, several top executives, including CEO Paul Webb, departed from the UK subsidiary.

In July 2023, ADSS withdrew from the UK market and applied to cancel its FCA authorisation. The subsidiary entered a members' voluntary liquidation and was dissolved on 21 August 2025.

== Operations ==
ADS Securities LLC (ADSS) is a limited liability company incorporated under the laws of the United Arab Emirates and registered with Abu Dhabi's Department of Economic Development. It is authorised and regulated by the UAE Capital Market Authority (CMA). The group also operated a Hong Kong subsidiary regulated by the Securities and Futures Commission (SFC).

ADSS offers brokerage and trading services through its proprietary multi-asset trading technology. The firm's business areas also include cross-asset investment, wealth management, and asset management services. ADSS was among the first firms to offer a Dubai Oil CFD.

According to the European Business Review, ADSS provides customer support services during weekdays only (24/5).

== Controversy ==
In 2022, the Abu Dhabi Global Market (ADGM) Financial Services Regulatory Authority (FSRA) found that ADSS's wealth-management subsidiary, ADS Investment Solutions Limited, had breached the Common Reporting Standard (CRS) Regulations by failing to properly collect, verify and report required CRS information. The FSRA imposed a total financial penalty and administrative fees of AED 30,000 and ordered remedial actions.

=== Etihad fundraising issue ===
Between 2015 and 2016, Etihad Airways Partners raised bond financing for Etihad and airlines in which it held equity stakes, including Air Berlin, Alitalia, Jet Airways, Air Serbia, and Air Seychelles. ADS Securities came under scrutiny in 2017 as a little-known Abu Dhabi broker that had played an outsized role in the Etihad-linked bond deals.

The controversy also involved transactions connected to financier Lars Windhorst. ADS Securities and Anoa Capital, two firms involved in raising $1.2 billion for Etihad Airways and its affiliates, had ties to Windhorst; Goldman Sachs also participated in the financing. In 2016, a deal involving $85 million worth of RNTS Media shares was not completed after ADS Securities failed to settle its side of the trade, temporarily leaving Goldman Sachs exposed to the position. By 2019, Windhorst was struggling to meet payments on a roughly $645 million bill to ADS Securities, stemming from unsettled trades and unpaid loans.

=== Dubai Papers ===
According to reporting by Africa Intelligence and other outlets on the Dubai Papers, ADS Securities was mentioned among intermediaries in an alleged money laundering and tax avoidance scheme associated with Helin International, involving transfers by ultra-high-net-worth individuals and public figures, including European aristocrats, Russian oligarchs, and former president of Angola José Eduardo dos Santos, among more than 200 Helin International clients.
