= National Rifle Association of Pakistan =

Sports governing body

- Sport: Shooting
- Jurisdiction: National
- Abbreviation: NRAP
- Founded: 1986
- Affiliation: International Shooting Sport Federation
- Regional affiliation: Asian Shooting Confederation
- Headquarters: Lahore
- President: Admiral Amjad Khan Niazi
- Vice president: Javaid Shamshad Lodhi
- Secretary: Razi Ahmad Khan
- (Pakistan)

The National Rifle Association of Pakistan is the governing body to develop and promote the sport of shooting in Pakistan. It is affiliated to the International Shooting Sport Federation and has responsibility for developing athletes to attend the Olympic Games.

The federation was formed in 1986. Alam Jan Mehsud served as its first president.

== Affiliations ==
The NRAP is affiliated with:

- International Shooting Sport Federation
- Asian Shooting Confederation
- Pakistan Olympic Association
- Pakistan Sports Board

== Affiliated associations ==
The following bodies are associated with NRAP:

- Balochistan Rifle Association
- KP Rifle Association
- Punjab Rifle Association
- Sindh Rifle Association
- Federal Rifle Association
- Pakistan Air Force
- Pakistan Army Rifle Association
- Pakistan Navy
