= ADS (motorcycle) =

Autocycle assembler

ADS were a small assembler of 98cc autocycles using Sachs and Ilo engines.
