= John Sitilides =

Geopolitical strategist

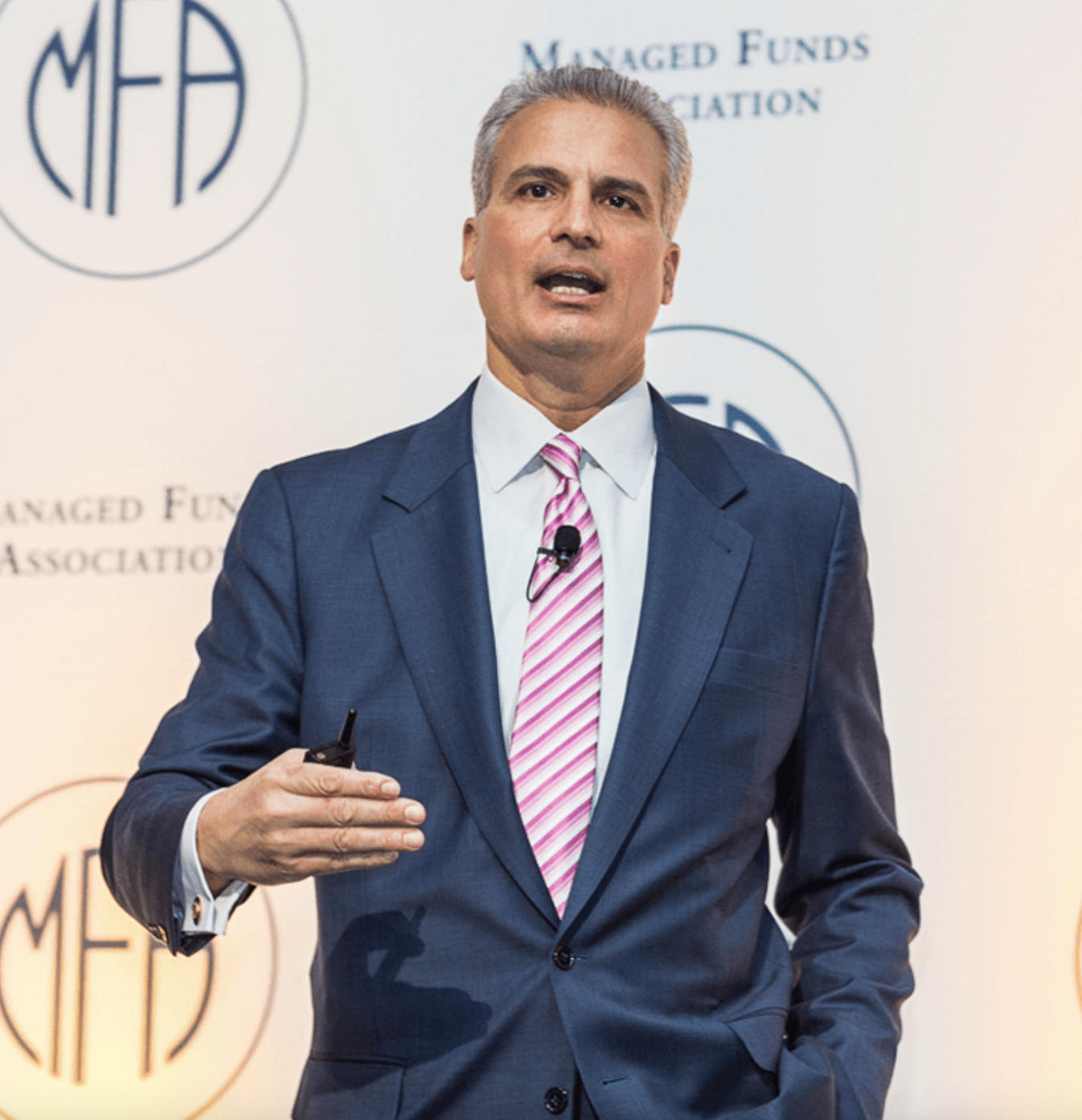
- Born: February 8, 1962 (age 64); Jersey City, NJ
- Education: Columbia University School of International and Public Affairs (1986); Queens College (1983)
- Website: sitilides.com

John Sitilides is a Washington, D.C. geopolitical strategist and diplomacy consultant to the U.S. Department of State.

Since 2006, Sitilides chairs the State Department's Advanced Area Studies Program for Southeast Europe (under a U.S. government contract) at the Foreign Service Institute, the primary training institution for U.S. diplomats and other foreign policy professionals.

He was Board Chairman of the Woodrow Wilson Center Southeast Europe Project, directing policy, research & forecast analysis on U.S., NATO & EU geopolitical, commercial, and security interests throughout southeastern Europe, from 2005 to 2011.

As Principal at Trilogy Advisors LLC since 2005, Sitilides manages a government affairs portfolio specializing in regulatory reform. He has testified before Congress, and is a regular media commentator on national security and American politics on broadcast, print and digital media.

== Education ==
Sitilides received his master's degree in international and public affairs at the Columbia University School of International and Public Affairs in 1986, with specialization in international security policy and Western European affairs, and his bachelor's degree in political science from Queens College in 1983.

== Career ==
Sitilides began as a communications and legislative aide to U.S. senator Al D'Amato (Republican of New York) from 1985 to 1993, and on the senator's successful 1986 & 1992 re-election campaigns.

He was a government affairs strategist to AKT Development Corporation, a major land development corporation in Sacramento, California, where he managed Congressional & Executive branch agency lobbying & communications strategies on federal wetlands, endangered species, and property rights issues from 1993 to 1997.

In 1998, he launched the Western Policy Center, a Washington, D.C. international relations organization researching and forecasting U.S., NATO & EU political, commercial and security issues in southeastern Europe.

After seven years as executive director, overseeing strategic planning, policy analysis, political and corporate communications, and financial management, he negotiated its 2004 merger with the Woodrow Wilson International Center for Scholars to establish the Southeast Europe Project, where he served as chairman, board of advisors from 2005 to 2011.

In 2005, he launched Trilogy Advisors LLC and resumed his government affairs and strategic communications practice. He also served as an alternate member of the Commerce Department's U.S.-Greece Initiative for Technology Cooperation in the Balkans, under President George W. Bush.

He is a member of the Association of International Risk Intelligence Professionals; the Intelligence and National Security Alliance, the U.S. Geospatial Intelligence Foundation, the Columbia University Club of Washington D.C., the Association of Former Senate Aides, the Federalist Society for Law and Public Policy Studies, and the New York State Society of Washington D.C. He received the 2007 "Greek Letters and Culture Award" for his contributions to the advancement of classical knowledge in American education, religion and culture.

== Published works ==
- "Cementing A Long-Term Deal With Greece," Washington Times, June 5, 2017
- "Threatening Farmers' Property Rights," Washington Times, May 1, 2017
- "How Global Risks Will Test the Trump Administration," Washington Times, January 13, 2017
- "The National Infrastructure Dilemma," Washington Times, December 9, 2016
- "Vortex of Turmoil, Vacuum of Power," Washington Times, June 4, 2016
- "A Question of Engagement: Geopolitics and the American Factor," (policy essay) Foundation for European & Foreign Policy, May 2014
- "The Modern Geopolitics of the Cyprus Question," (policy essay) Mediterranean Quarterly, Winter 2014
- "The View From Across The Atlantic," (essay) Odyssey Magazine, November/December 2009
- "Quiet Bridge-Building in Greek-Turkish Relations," (co-authored op-ed) Washington Times, January 26, 2008
- "Forward East: Euro-Atlantic Security in the Black Sea Basin," (book chapter), published by the NATO Science for Peace and Security Committee (2007)
- "U.S. Policy in the Islamic World", (book chapter) see Public Lectures Yearbook, published by the Diplomatic Institute of the Ministry of Foreign Affairs of the Republic of Bulgaria (2006)
- "The Road Through Brussels: The U.S.-Turkey Agenda", (policy essay) Turkish Policy Quarterly, Summer 2005
- "Strategic Engagement in a New Era", (essay) BBC International, October 2004
