= Rizes =

Rizes Ρίζες
- Community
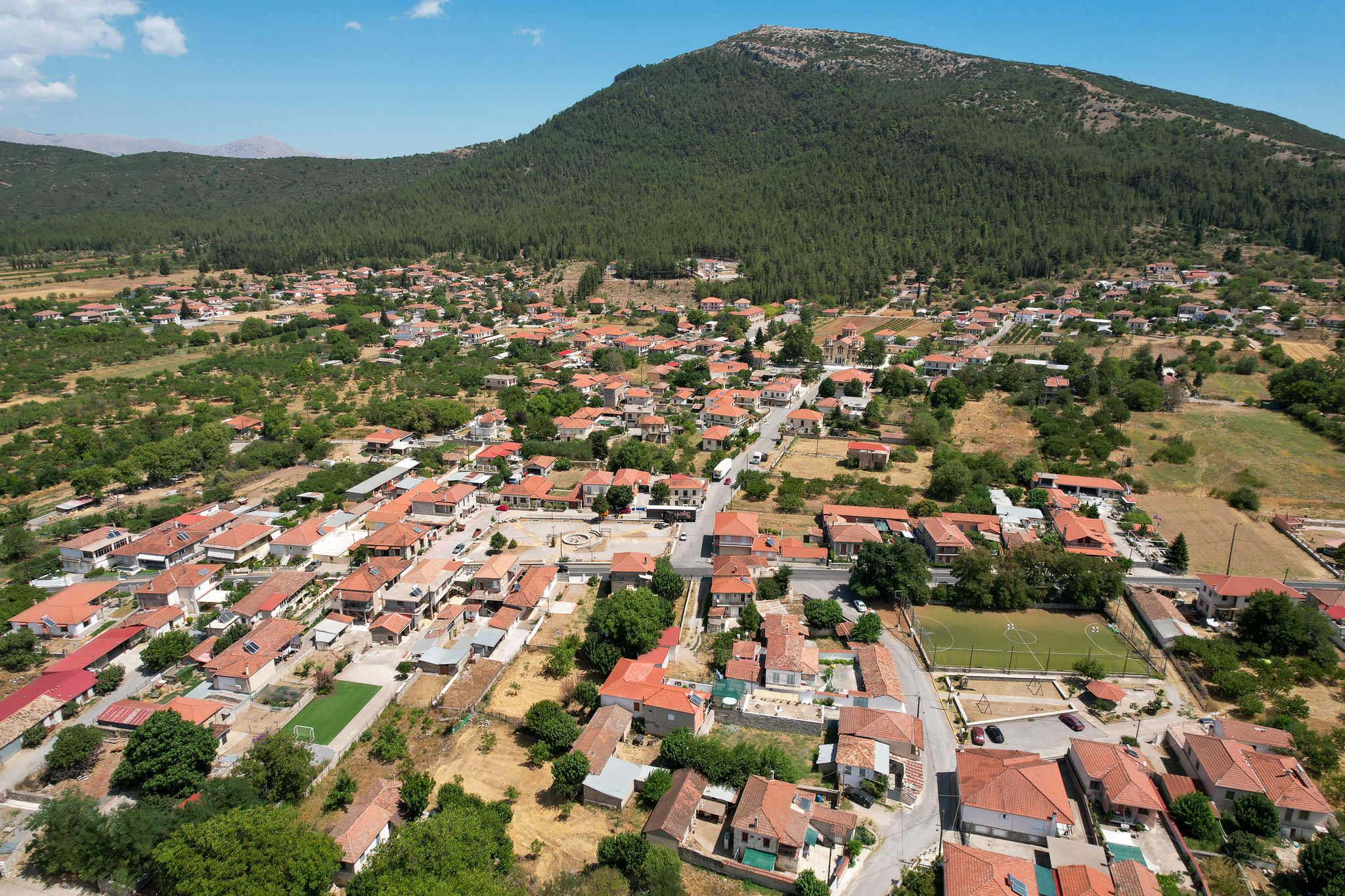

- Location within Greece
- Coordinates: 37°27′N 22°25′E
- Country: Greece
- Administrative region: Peloponnese
- Regional unit: Arcadia
- Municipality: Tripoli
- Municipal unit: Tegea
- Elevation: 650 m (2,130 ft)

Population (2021)
  - Community: 449
- Time zone: UTC+2 (EET)
  - Summer (DST): UTC+3 (EEST)
- Postal code: 220 12
- Area code: 271
- Vehicle registration: TP

Rizes (Greek: Ρίζες or Ρίζαι) is the easternmost village in the municipal unit of Tegea in Arcadia, Greece. Its population was 449 in 2021. Its primary economic activity is agriculture. Rizes' crops include cherries, potatoes, and grape cultivation and wine production. The village lies at the roots of the mountain named Saint Elias (Προφήτης Ηλίας) which includes four noteworthy churches. At the summit is the small church of the Prophet Elias followed by in order of descending elevation the churches of Saint Nicholas, Saint Marina and Saint Spyridon. The feast of Saint Marina is celebrated every year on 17 July with a popular festival in the village.

== Notable individuals ==
- John Poulakidas (born 2003), Greek-American professional basketball player, of local descent on his mother’s side.
- Angelo Tsakopoulos (born August 4, 1936), Greek-American businessman and real estate developer.
