= Center for Advanced Defense Studies =

American think tank

Center for Advanced Defense Studies (C4ADS)
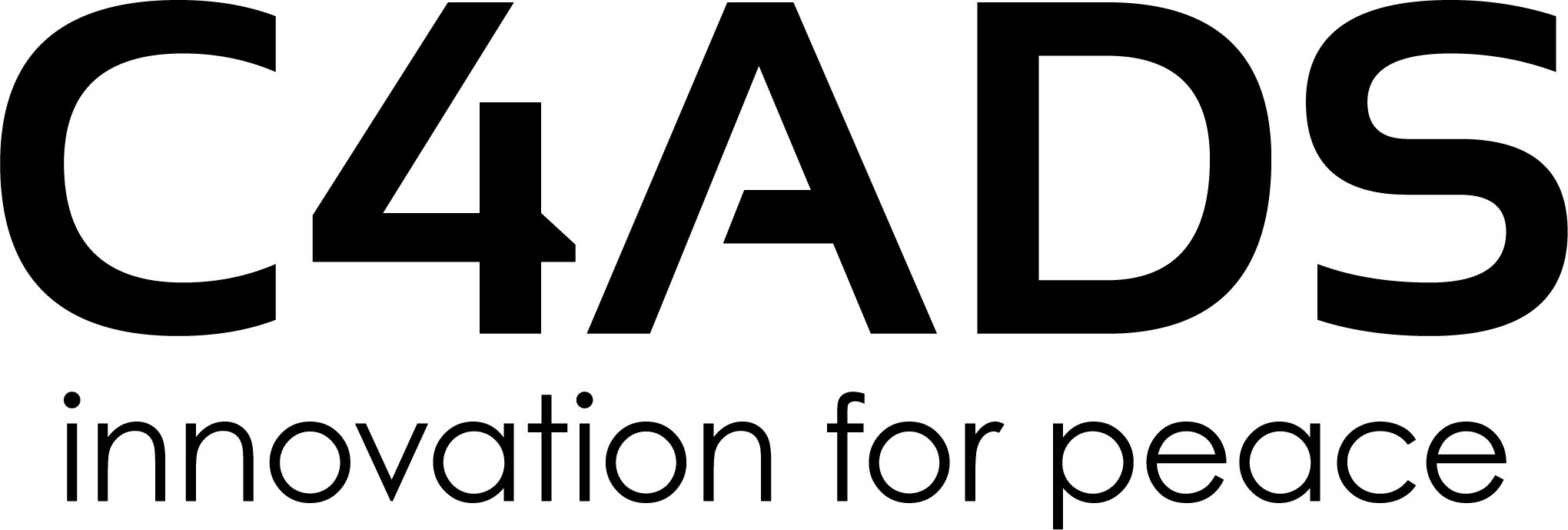
- Abbreviation: C4ADS
- Type: Think tank; 501(c)(3) organization
- Tax ID no.: 73-1681366
- Headquarters: 1201 I St. NW, Suite 200
- Location: Washington, DC, USA 20005
- Website: c4ads.org

The Center for Advanced Defense Studies is a 501(c)(3) nonprofit research organization based in Washington, D.C., that provides data-driven analysis and evidence-based reporting on global conflict and transnational security issues.

== Leadership ==
As of July 2026, C4ADS' board is chaired by April H. Foley.

== Reception ==
In December 2023, in response to new US government sanctions on PRC officials and companies over human rights abuses in Xinjiang, the Chinese Ministry of Foreign Affairs imposed counter sanctions on former C4ADS analyst Nicole Morgret, risk analytics firm Kharon, and its research director Edmund Xu for their work related to Uyghur Forced Labor Prevention Act compliance.
