= Autonomous detection system =

Automated biohazard detection system

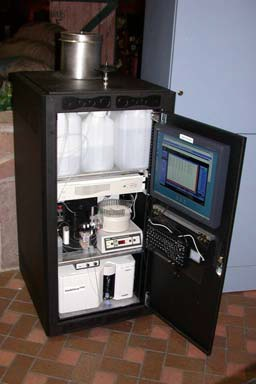
Autonomous Pathogen Detection System by Lawrence Livermore National Laboratory

Autonomous Detection Systems (ADS), also called biohazard detection systems or autonomous pathogen detection systems, are designed to monitor air or water in an environment and to detect the presence of airborne or waterborne chemicals, toxins, pathogens, or other biological agents capable of causing human illness or death. These systems monitor air or water continuously and send real-time alerts to appropriate authorities in the event of an act of bioterrorism or biological warfare.

== History ==
In the United States, an ADS system (BDS) was developed for the U.S. Postal Service following the 2001 anthrax attacks. The first detection systems in U.S. postal services were installed in 2006. To counter such problems in the future, the United States federal government set up a program called BioWatch, which operates in more than 21 cities in the US.

In Canada, an autonomous pathogen detection system was developed by a biotechnology company called Kraken Sense for the Greater Toronto Airports Authority (GTAA) during the COVID-19 pandemic.

=== BioWatch ===
The BioWatch program is funded and supervised by the Department of Homeland Security (DHS). The BioWatch program has three main components: sampling, analysis, and response. Each of these components is handled by three different agencies. The Environmental Protection Agency (EPA) handles the sampling component: the sensors that collect airborne particles. The Centers for Disease Control and Prevention (CDC) coordinates the analysis and laboratory testing of the samples. Local authorities are responsible for the public health response to positive findings. The Federal Bureau of Investigation (FBI) is designated as the lead agency for the law enforcement response if a bioterrorism event is detected. (Shea and Lister, 2003)

=== Kraken Sense GTAA Biosurveillance ===
Using the KRAKEN autonomous qPCR device, Kraken Sense monitored airport wastewater for the presence of SARS-CoV-2 variants, such as Omicron, and Monkeypox to act as an early warning system for infectious diseases entering the country. This program was funded in part by the National Research Council Canada Industrial Research Assistance Program (NRC IRAP).

== Mechanism ==
APDS monitors air and water for the three types of biological threat agents: bacteria, viruses, and toxins. The autonomous detection system is capable of (1) rapidly processing and accurately analyzing aerosol or water samples with a high level of confidence; (2) automating and integrating the major system functions into the detector, including sample collection, preparation, analysis, and analytical results reporting; (3) operating in its intended indoor and outdoor environments; and (4) disseminating and archiving analysis results and system operational data via the C3 network, known as the BioWatch Gen-3 Operations Support Service.

APDS operates continuously; the system can detect low concentrations of bioagents that might go undetected by a system that is triggered only when the overall number of particles in the air is high. APDS collects samples, prepares them for analysis, and tests for multiple biological agents. This automation reduces the cost and staffing that would be required to manually analyze samples.

As APDS collects air or water samples, it first runs them through an immunoassay detector. If that detector returns a positive result, APDS performs a second assay based on nucleic-acid amplification and detection. Having two different assay systems increases system reliability and minimizes the possibility of false positives.

The immunoassay detector incorporates liquid arrays, a multiplexed assay that uses small-diameter polystyrene beads (microbeads) coated with thousands of antibodies. Each microbead is colored with a unique combination of red- and orange-emitting dyes. The number of agents that can be detected in a sample is limited only by the number of colored bead sets. When the sample is exposed to the beads, a bioagent, if present, binds to the bead with the appropriate antibody. A second fluorescently labeled antibody is then added to the sample, resulting in a highly fluorescent target for flow analysis. Preparing the sample and performing this first analysis takes less than 30 minutes.

Nucleic acid assays require amplification of one or more target sequences of nucleic acid. Short strands of single-stranded DNA are synthesized in known sequences and attached to spots in the array in a predetermined way Detection of these spots that contain hybridized target DNA allows one to the sequence of DNA in the unknown target. RNA readily hybridizes to form double-stranded structures to its complementary sequence (A-T, C-G, G-C, U-A). Thus, arrays of single-stranded DNA can be used to detect RNA via hybridization.

TABLE 1.1 Centers for Disease Control and Prevention (CDC) Prioritized List of Biological Threat Agents^{a}

Disease (Organism)	Agent Type^{b}
Category A^{c}
Anthrax (Bacillus anthracis)	B
Botulism (Clostridium botulinum toxin)	T
Plague (Yersinia pestis)	B
Smallpox (variola major)	V
Tularemia (Francisella tularensis)	B
Viral hemorrhagic fevers (filoviruses—e.g., Ebola and Marburg—and arenaviruses—e.g., Lassa and Machupo)	V
Category B^{d}
Brucellosis (Brucella species)	B
Epsilon toxin (from Clostridium perfringens)	T
Food safety threats (e.g., Salmonella species, Escherichia coli O157:H7, Shigella)	B
Glanders (Burkholderia mallei)	B
Melioidosis (Burkholderia pseudomallei)	B
Psittacosis (Chlamydia psittaci)	B
Q fever (Coxiella burnetii)	B
Ricin toxin (from Ricinus communis—castor beans)	T
Staphylococcal enterotoxin B	T
Typhus fever (Rickettsia prowazekii)	B
Viral encephalitis (alphaviruses such as Venezuelan equine encephalitis, eastern equine encephalitis, western equine encephalitis)	V
Water safety threats (e.g., Vibrio cholerae, Cryptosporidium parvum)	B
Category C^{e}
Emerging infectious diseases such as Nipah virus and hantavirus	V
^{a} Available at http://www.cdc.gov. Accessed August 2003.^{b} B = bacterium; V = virus; T = toxin.^{c} Category A includes the highest priority agents that pose a risk to national security because they can be easily disseminated or transmitted from person to person; result in high mortality rates and have the potential for major public health impact; might cause public panic and social disruption; and require special action for public health preparedness.^{d} Category B agents are the second highest priority and include those that are moderately easy to disseminate; result in moderate morbidity rates and low mortality rates; and require specific enhancements of CDC's diagnostic capacity and enhanced disease surveillance.^{e} Category C agents are the third highest priority and include emerging pathogens that could be engineered for mass dissemination in the future because of availability; ease of production and dissemination; and potential for high morbidity and mortality rates and major health impact.

Research Internationals sells standalone and portable systems for use in mailrooms, called ASAP II. ASAP II gives real time detection of bio-warfare agents, chemical agents and toxic industrial chemicals, explosives in particulate and vapor form and nuclear materials. The system can be customised according to the need of the mailroom.

ASAP II is an automated chemical, biological and nuclear detection and identification system. The system can detect and identify from four (RAPTOR module) to eight (BioHawk module) bio-agents in real time. Periodically or on demand, a concentrated sample is sent to the modules and within fifteen minutes these systems will identify the presence of any bioagents and notify the operator if a hazardous agent is detected.

The systems need to be in a negative pressure room on a downward draft table. An air sampling module within the systems draws air into the downward draft table for analysis. Sampling is continuous until the batch of mail is complete, which may take a few minutes, hours or days. The systems are able to handle thousands of pieces of mail per hour.

== Application ==
The system can be adapted for situations where environmental or clinical pathogens require monitoring. For example, APDS could test for mold or fungal spores in buildings or for the airborne spread of contagious materials in hospitals. It also could identify disease outbreaks in livestock transport centers or feedlots. In water, APDS can detect pathogens in wastewater, agricultural irrigation lines, food processors, fish farms, and beaches.

=== Automated Mailroom Detection Systems ===
==== BioAlert System ====
Research International produces and sells the TacBio particle detection system. The system samples the air continuously and monitors for aerosol particle or bio-particle levels

It does not identify the type of bio-particle detected but will notify the mailroom attendant if either excess particles or bio-particles are present. This is an early warning system that gives the mailroom supervisor enough time to notice a potential threat and to test for biological agents or airborne threats before mail is delivered to a recipient.

==== Hand Held and Stand Alone Systems ====
ChemPRO 100 Chemical Detection System is a handheld chemical detector for field detection and classification of Chemical Warfare Agents. If mail arrives with an unidentified substance, this hand held detector can be used to immediately identify the chemical.

Hardened Mobile Trace Explosive Particle tests for a wide range of explosives and narcotics in seconds. The system will identify explosives in packages or envelopes that are often undetectable by x-ray machines. This handheld detector expands the range of target explosives you can identify in a single sample for faster more comprehensive screening. As noted, this system also detects a wide range of narcotics. The system tests for explosives and narcotics simultaneously in a single sample, for faster, more comprehensive screening.

=== Automated Water Detection Systems ===
==== KRAKEN ====
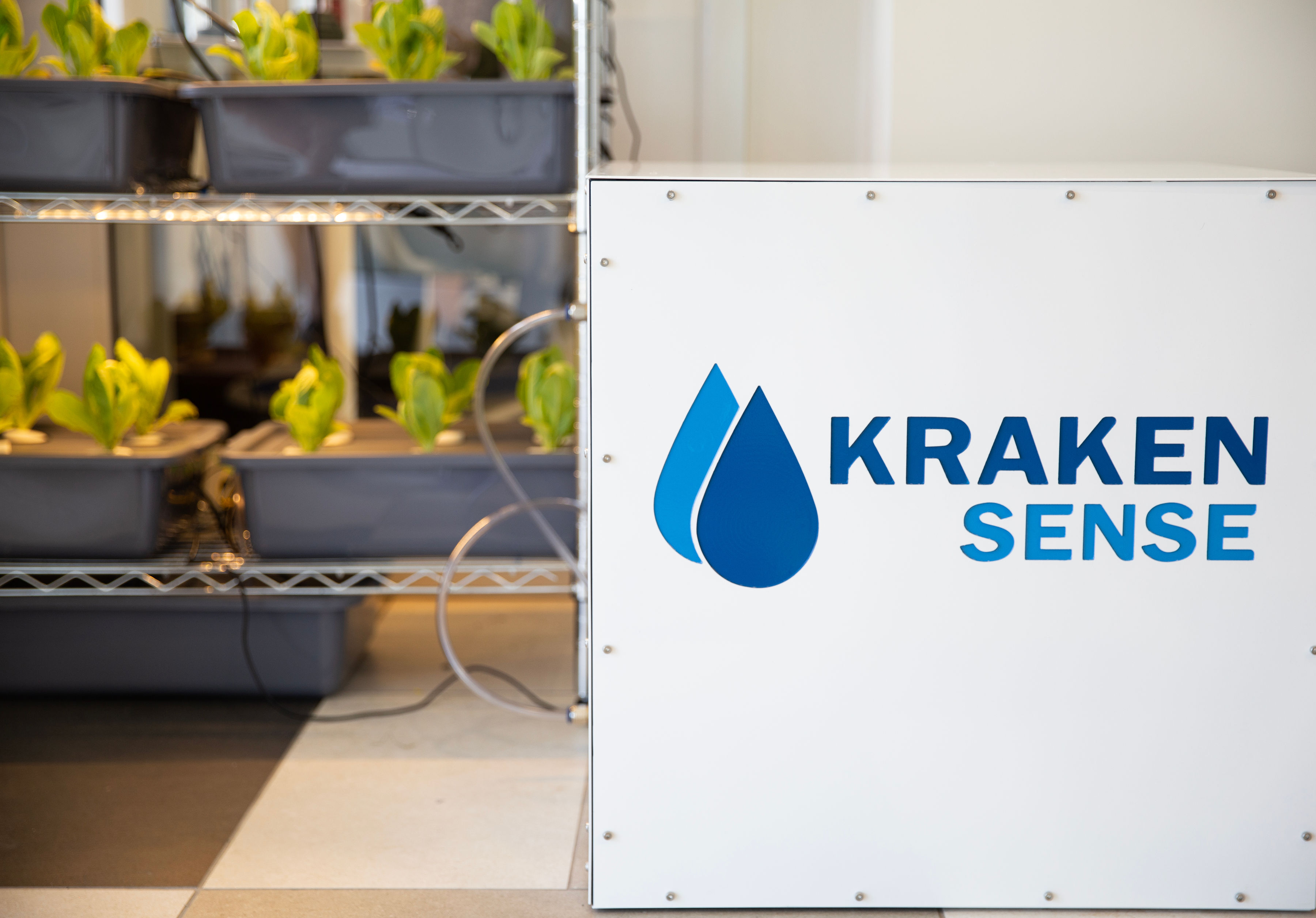
In-line autonomous pathogen detection of a hydroponics system from Kraken Sense

Kraken Sense produces the KRAKEN autonomous pathogen detection system. The device continuously samples any water source in real-time, delivering results in as low as 60 minutes to alert of potential contamination. If contamination is detected in agricultural water sources or food processors, for example, operators can remove the compromised batch before the product enters the market, preventing foodborne illness. Furthermore, using the KRAKEN in wastewater can act as a biosurveillance system that allows more time for public health authorities to prepare for a possible infectious disease outbreak.

== Sources ==
- "Responding to Detection of Aerosolized Bacillus anthracis by Autonomous Detection Systems in the Workplace". Centers for Disease Control and Prevention. 30 April 2004.
- "FAQ: What is the USPS® Biohazard Detection System?" (PDF). UPS. 2013.
