= April H. Foley =

Ambassador of the United States to Hungary (born 1947)

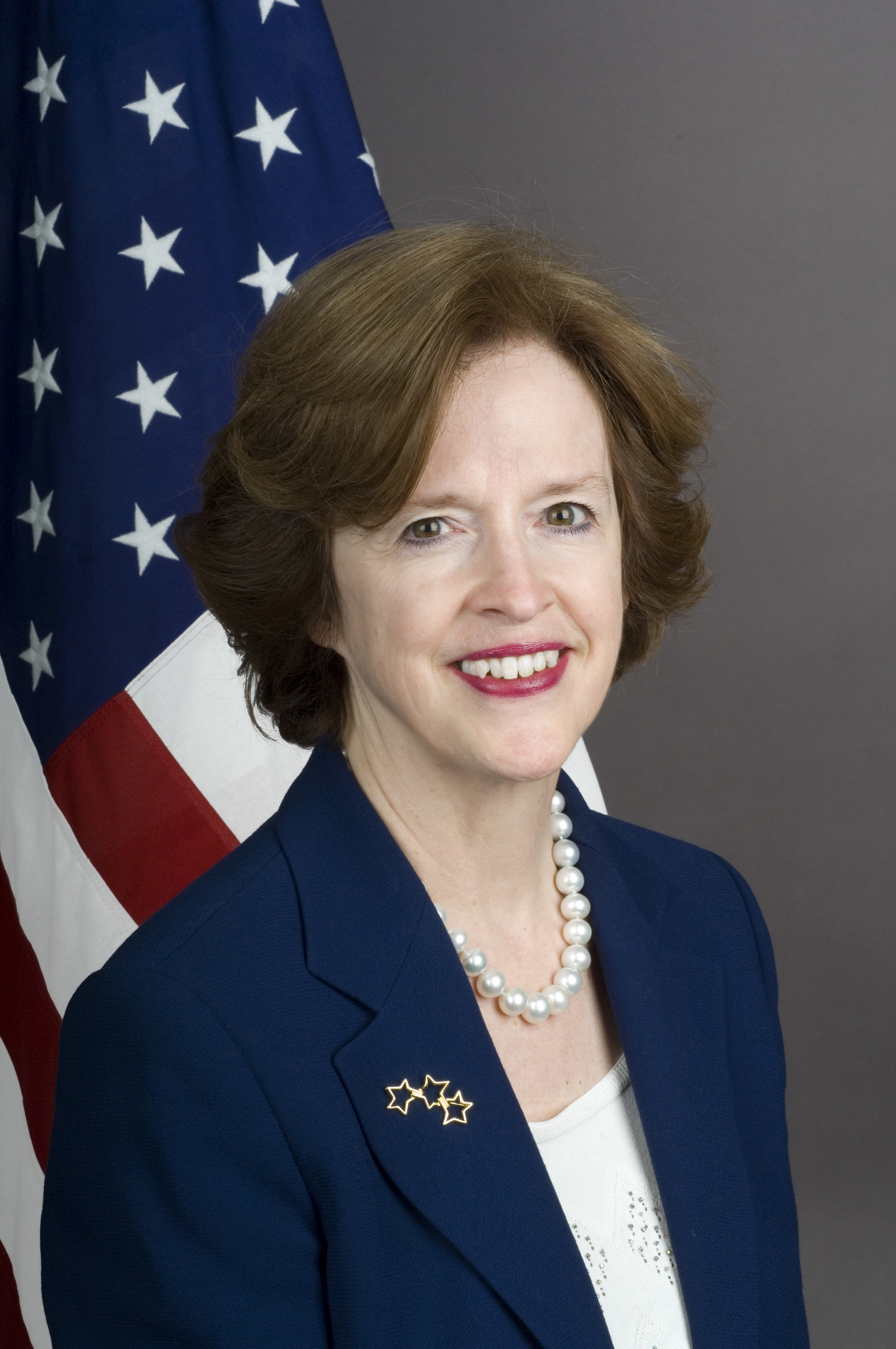
Official photograph of April H. Foley as ambassador to Hungary

April H. Foley (born 1947) is an American former diplomat who served as the U.S. ambassador to Hungary from 2006 to 2009. She was the chair of the board of trustees of The Hungary Initiatives Foundation. Foley attributed her appointment as ambassador to her friendship with George W. Bush, a classmate from Harvard.

== Biography ==
Foley was born in 1947. She earned a Bachelor of Arts degree from Smith College and a Master of Business Administration from Harvard Business School.

== Career ==
Before her appointment as ambassador, Foley was a director at the Export–Import Bank of the United States, becoming first vice president and vice chairman in 2003. She played a vital role in the creation of the Trade Bank of Iraq and was one of six Americans on the American-Iraqi Joint Economic Council. For 17 years, Foley was an executive for PepsiCo in roles including strategic planning, financial management, and mergers and acquisitions and her work led to PepsiCo's acquisition and integration of Kentucky Fried Chicken.

As ambassador, she considers her biggest success to be getting Hungary to be part of the Visa Waiver Program.
